

56001–56100 

|-bgcolor=#fefefe
| 56001 ||  || — || September 20, 1998 || La Silla || E. W. Elst || FLO || align=right | 1.9 km || 
|-id=002 bgcolor=#fefefe
| 56002 ||  || — || September 20, 1998 || La Silla || E. W. Elst || — || align=right | 1.4 km || 
|-id=003 bgcolor=#fefefe
| 56003 ||  || — || September 26, 1998 || Socorro || LINEAR || NYS || align=right | 1.2 km || 
|-id=004 bgcolor=#fefefe
| 56004 ||  || — || September 26, 1998 || Socorro || LINEAR || — || align=right | 1.6 km || 
|-id=005 bgcolor=#E9E9E9
| 56005 ||  || — || September 22, 1998 || Anderson Mesa || LONEOS || GEF || align=right | 3.1 km || 
|-id=006 bgcolor=#fefefe
| 56006 ||  || — || October 13, 1998 || Kitt Peak || Spacewatch || — || align=right | 2.4 km || 
|-id=007 bgcolor=#fefefe
| 56007 ||  || — || October 14, 1998 || Kitt Peak || Spacewatch || — || align=right | 1.5 km || 
|-id=008 bgcolor=#fefefe
| 56008 ||  || — || October 13, 1998 || Kitt Peak || Spacewatch || FLO || align=right | 1.2 km || 
|-id=009 bgcolor=#fefefe
| 56009 ||  || — || October 14, 1998 || Anderson Mesa || LONEOS || NYS || align=right | 1.3 km || 
|-id=010 bgcolor=#fefefe
| 56010 ||  || — || October 24, 1998 || Oizumi || T. Kobayashi || FLO || align=right | 5.0 km || 
|-id=011 bgcolor=#fefefe
| 56011 ||  || — || October 23, 1998 || Caussols || ODAS || FLO || align=right | 2.8 km || 
|-id=012 bgcolor=#fefefe
| 56012 ||  || — || October 27, 1998 || Višnjan Observatory || K. Korlević || — || align=right | 1.9 km || 
|-id=013 bgcolor=#fefefe
| 56013 ||  || — || October 29, 1998 || Višnjan Observatory || K. Korlević || PHO || align=right | 2.7 km || 
|-id=014 bgcolor=#fefefe
| 56014 ||  || — || October 18, 1998 || La Silla || E. W. Elst || — || align=right | 1.5 km || 
|-id=015 bgcolor=#fefefe
| 56015 ||  || — || October 18, 1998 || La Silla || E. W. Elst || FLO || align=right | 1.6 km || 
|-id=016 bgcolor=#fefefe
| 56016 ||  || — || October 28, 1998 || Socorro || LINEAR || FLO || align=right | 1.5 km || 
|-id=017 bgcolor=#fefefe
| 56017 ||  || — || November 11, 1998 || Caussols || ODAS || MAS || align=right | 1.8 km || 
|-id=018 bgcolor=#fefefe
| 56018 ||  || — || November 11, 1998 || Caussols || ODAS || — || align=right | 1.4 km || 
|-id=019 bgcolor=#fefefe
| 56019 ||  || — || November 11, 1998 || Socorro || LINEAR || — || align=right | 1.7 km || 
|-id=020 bgcolor=#fefefe
| 56020 ||  || — || November 10, 1998 || Socorro || LINEAR || — || align=right | 1.5 km || 
|-id=021 bgcolor=#fefefe
| 56021 ||  || — || November 10, 1998 || Socorro || LINEAR || — || align=right | 1.7 km || 
|-id=022 bgcolor=#fefefe
| 56022 ||  || — || November 10, 1998 || Socorro || LINEAR || — || align=right | 2.0 km || 
|-id=023 bgcolor=#fefefe
| 56023 ||  || — || November 10, 1998 || Socorro || LINEAR || V || align=right | 1.7 km || 
|-id=024 bgcolor=#fefefe
| 56024 ||  || — || November 10, 1998 || Socorro || LINEAR || — || align=right | 2.4 km || 
|-id=025 bgcolor=#fefefe
| 56025 ||  || — || November 10, 1998 || Socorro || LINEAR || — || align=right | 2.0 km || 
|-id=026 bgcolor=#fefefe
| 56026 ||  || — || November 13, 1998 || Socorro || LINEAR || — || align=right | 3.6 km || 
|-id=027 bgcolor=#fefefe
| 56027 ||  || — || November 18, 1998 || Catalina || CSS || PHO || align=right | 2.7 km || 
|-id=028 bgcolor=#fefefe
| 56028 ||  || — || November 21, 1998 || Socorro || LINEAR || — || align=right | 1.6 km || 
|-id=029 bgcolor=#fefefe
| 56029 ||  || — || November 21, 1998 || Socorro || LINEAR || NYS || align=right | 1.6 km || 
|-id=030 bgcolor=#fefefe
| 56030 ||  || — || November 21, 1998 || Socorro || LINEAR || V || align=right | 1.4 km || 
|-id=031 bgcolor=#fefefe
| 56031 ||  || — || November 21, 1998 || Socorro || LINEAR || — || align=right | 2.7 km || 
|-id=032 bgcolor=#fefefe
| 56032 ||  || — || November 21, 1998 || Socorro || LINEAR || — || align=right | 1.8 km || 
|-id=033 bgcolor=#fefefe
| 56033 ||  || — || November 21, 1998 || Socorro || LINEAR || FLO || align=right | 2.6 km || 
|-id=034 bgcolor=#E9E9E9
| 56034 ||  || — || November 25, 1998 || Socorro || LINEAR || — || align=right | 3.0 km || 
|-id=035 bgcolor=#fefefe
| 56035 ||  || — || November 18, 1998 || Socorro || LINEAR || — || align=right | 1.8 km || 
|-id=036 bgcolor=#fefefe
| 56036 ||  || — || November 23, 1998 || Catalina || CSS || PHO || align=right | 2.7 km || 
|-id=037 bgcolor=#fefefe
| 56037 ||  || — || November 20, 1998 || Anderson Mesa || LONEOS || V || align=right | 1.5 km || 
|-id=038 bgcolor=#E9E9E9
| 56038 Jackmapanje ||  ||  || December 7, 1998 || Colleverde || V. S. Casulli || — || align=right | 2.1 km || 
|-id=039 bgcolor=#fefefe
| 56039 ||  || — || December 9, 1998 || Oizumi || T. Kobayashi || — || align=right | 2.5 km || 
|-id=040 bgcolor=#fefefe
| 56040 ||  || — || December 9, 1998 || Oizumi || T. Kobayashi || NYS || align=right | 2.0 km || 
|-id=041 bgcolor=#fefefe
| 56041 Luciendumont ||  ||  || December 8, 1998 || Blauvac || R. Roy || — || align=right | 2.6 km || 
|-id=042 bgcolor=#fefefe
| 56042 ||  || — || December 15, 1998 || Caussols || ODAS || V || align=right | 3.6 km || 
|-id=043 bgcolor=#fefefe
| 56043 ||  || — || December 14, 1998 || Prescott || P. G. Comba || FLO || align=right | 2.8 km || 
|-id=044 bgcolor=#fefefe
| 56044 ||  || — || December 15, 1998 || Woomera || F. B. Zoltowski || NYS || align=right | 2.0 km || 
|-id=045 bgcolor=#fefefe
| 56045 ||  || — || December 10, 1998 || Kitt Peak || Spacewatch || — || align=right | 3.0 km || 
|-id=046 bgcolor=#fefefe
| 56046 ||  || — || December 15, 1998 || Xinglong || SCAP || — || align=right | 5.1 km || 
|-id=047 bgcolor=#fefefe
| 56047 ||  || — || December 14, 1998 || Socorro || LINEAR || — || align=right | 1.8 km || 
|-id=048 bgcolor=#fefefe
| 56048 ||  || — || December 14, 1998 || Socorro || LINEAR || — || align=right | 2.4 km || 
|-id=049 bgcolor=#E9E9E9
| 56049 ||  || — || December 14, 1998 || Socorro || LINEAR || — || align=right | 2.9 km || 
|-id=050 bgcolor=#fefefe
| 56050 ||  || — || December 14, 1998 || Socorro || LINEAR || ERI || align=right | 2.0 km || 
|-id=051 bgcolor=#fefefe
| 56051 ||  || — || December 14, 1998 || Socorro || LINEAR || NYS || align=right | 2.1 km || 
|-id=052 bgcolor=#fefefe
| 56052 ||  || — || December 14, 1998 || Socorro || LINEAR || FLO || align=right | 2.1 km || 
|-id=053 bgcolor=#fefefe
| 56053 ||  || — || December 14, 1998 || Socorro || LINEAR || — || align=right | 1.8 km || 
|-id=054 bgcolor=#fefefe
| 56054 ||  || — || December 14, 1998 || Socorro || LINEAR || — || align=right | 1.8 km || 
|-id=055 bgcolor=#fefefe
| 56055 ||  || — || December 14, 1998 || Socorro || LINEAR || V || align=right | 1.9 km || 
|-id=056 bgcolor=#fefefe
| 56056 ||  || — || December 15, 1998 || Socorro || LINEAR || slow? || align=right | 3.1 km || 
|-id=057 bgcolor=#fefefe
| 56057 ||  || — || December 15, 1998 || Socorro || LINEAR || NYS || align=right | 1.7 km || 
|-id=058 bgcolor=#fefefe
| 56058 ||  || — || December 11, 1998 || Socorro || LINEAR || — || align=right | 2.9 km || 
|-id=059 bgcolor=#fefefe
| 56059 ||  || — || December 14, 1998 || Socorro || LINEAR || FLO || align=right | 2.4 km || 
|-id=060 bgcolor=#fefefe
| 56060 ||  || — || December 14, 1998 || Socorro || LINEAR || — || align=right | 2.0 km || 
|-id=061 bgcolor=#fefefe
| 56061 ||  || — || December 15, 1998 || Socorro || LINEAR || — || align=right | 1.8 km || 
|-id=062 bgcolor=#E9E9E9
| 56062 ||  || — || December 15, 1998 || Socorro || LINEAR || — || align=right | 2.3 km || 
|-id=063 bgcolor=#fefefe
| 56063 ||  || — || December 15, 1998 || Socorro || LINEAR || — || align=right | 4.7 km || 
|-id=064 bgcolor=#fefefe
| 56064 ||  || — || December 15, 1998 || Socorro || LINEAR || — || align=right | 2.5 km || 
|-id=065 bgcolor=#fefefe
| 56065 ||  || — || December 12, 1998 || Mérida || O. A. Naranjo || V || align=right | 1.3 km || 
|-id=066 bgcolor=#fefefe
| 56066 || 1998 YA || — || December 16, 1998 || Višnjan Observatory || K. Korlević || MAS || align=right | 2.4 km || 
|-id=067 bgcolor=#E9E9E9
| 56067 ||  || — || December 17, 1998 || Caussols || ODAS || EUN || align=right | 4.4 km || 
|-id=068 bgcolor=#fefefe
| 56068 ||  || — || December 17, 1998 || Caussols || ODAS || NYS || align=right | 2.0 km || 
|-id=069 bgcolor=#fefefe
| 56069 ||  || — || December 17, 1998 || Gekko || T. Kagawa || — || align=right | 1.9 km || 
|-id=070 bgcolor=#fefefe
| 56070 ||  || — || December 21, 1998 || Oizumi || T. Kobayashi || — || align=right | 2.5 km || 
|-id=071 bgcolor=#fefefe
| 56071 ||  || — || December 22, 1998 || Catalina || CSS || — || align=right | 2.4 km || 
|-id=072 bgcolor=#fefefe
| 56072 ||  || — || December 24, 1998 || Oizumi || T. Kobayashi || — || align=right | 1.6 km || 
|-id=073 bgcolor=#fefefe
| 56073 ||  || — || December 26, 1998 || San Marcello || M. Tombelli, A. Boattini || NYS || align=right | 1.7 km || 
|-id=074 bgcolor=#fefefe
| 56074 ||  || — || December 25, 1998 || Kitt Peak || Spacewatch || NYS || align=right | 1.6 km || 
|-id=075 bgcolor=#E9E9E9
| 56075 ||  || — || December 26, 1998 || Kitt Peak || Spacewatch || EUN || align=right | 4.7 km || 
|-id=076 bgcolor=#E9E9E9
| 56076 ||  || — || December 27, 1998 || Anderson Mesa || LONEOS || EUN || align=right | 3.7 km || 
|-id=077 bgcolor=#fefefe
| 56077 ||  || — || December 21, 1998 || Socorro || LINEAR || PHO || align=right | 2.7 km || 
|-id=078 bgcolor=#E9E9E9
| 56078 || 1999 AT || — || January 7, 1999 || Oizumi || T. Kobayashi || — || align=right | 2.5 km || 
|-id=079 bgcolor=#E9E9E9
| 56079 ||  || — || January 9, 1999 || Oizumi || T. Kobayashi || MAR || align=right | 3.9 km || 
|-id=080 bgcolor=#fefefe
| 56080 ||  || — || January 9, 1999 || Gekko || T. Kagawa || FLO || align=right | 2.8 km || 
|-id=081 bgcolor=#fefefe
| 56081 ||  || — || January 10, 1999 || Fair Oaks Ranch || J. V. McClusky || — || align=right | 3.9 km || 
|-id=082 bgcolor=#fefefe
| 56082 ||  || — || January 9, 1999 || Xinglong || SCAP || NYS || align=right | 1.4 km || 
|-id=083 bgcolor=#fefefe
| 56083 ||  || — || January 10, 1999 || Kitt Peak || Spacewatch || NYS || align=right | 1.9 km || 
|-id=084 bgcolor=#fefefe
| 56084 ||  || — || January 13, 1999 || Kitt Peak || Spacewatch || — || align=right | 2.8 km || 
|-id=085 bgcolor=#fefefe
| 56085 ||  || — || January 13, 1999 || Kitt Peak || Spacewatch || — || align=right | 2.4 km || 
|-id=086 bgcolor=#fefefe
| 56086 ||  || — || January 13, 1999 || Nachi-Katsuura || Y. Shimizu, T. Urata || PHO || align=right | 5.2 km || 
|-id=087 bgcolor=#fefefe
| 56087 ||  || — || January 13, 1999 || Xinglong || SCAP || NYS || align=right | 2.1 km || 
|-id=088 bgcolor=#E9E9E9
| 56088 Wuheng ||  ||  || January 14, 1999 || Xinglong || SCAP || — || align=right | 4.6 km || 
|-id=089 bgcolor=#fefefe
| 56089 ||  || — || January 6, 1999 || Višnjan Observatory || K. Korlević || NYS || align=right | 1.6 km || 
|-id=090 bgcolor=#fefefe
| 56090 || 1999 BE || — || January 16, 1999 || Oizumi || T. Kobayashi || V || align=right | 2.2 km || 
|-id=091 bgcolor=#fefefe
| 56091 || 1999 BJ || — || January 16, 1999 || Oizumi || T. Kobayashi || — || align=right | 2.2 km || 
|-id=092 bgcolor=#E9E9E9
| 56092 || 1999 BK || — || January 16, 1999 || Oizumi || T. Kobayashi || BRU || align=right | 7.0 km || 
|-id=093 bgcolor=#fefefe
| 56093 ||  || — || January 18, 1999 || Kitt Peak || Spacewatch || EUT || align=right | 2.3 km || 
|-id=094 bgcolor=#fefefe
| 56094 ||  || — || January 20, 1999 || Višnjan Observatory || K. Korlević || V || align=right | 1.9 km || 
|-id=095 bgcolor=#E9E9E9
| 56095 ||  || — || January 20, 1999 || Caussols || ODAS || GEF || align=right | 4.2 km || 
|-id=096 bgcolor=#E9E9E9
| 56096 ||  || — || January 22, 1999 || Višnjan Observatory || K. Korlević || EUN || align=right | 3.9 km || 
|-id=097 bgcolor=#fefefe
| 56097 ||  || — || January 21, 1999 || Uto || F. Uto || V || align=right | 1.8 km || 
|-id=098 bgcolor=#E9E9E9
| 56098 ||  || — || January 24, 1999 || Višnjan Observatory || K. Korlević || — || align=right | 2.4 km || 
|-id=099 bgcolor=#E9E9E9
| 56099 ||  || — || January 25, 1999 || Višnjan Observatory || K. Korlević || MAR || align=right | 3.5 km || 
|-id=100 bgcolor=#fefefe
| 56100 Luisapolli ||  ||  || January 24, 1999 || Gnosca || S. Sposetti || NYS || align=right | 6.2 km || 
|}

56101–56200 

|-bgcolor=#fefefe
| 56101 ||  || — || January 18, 1999 || Uenohara || N. Kawasato || NYS || align=right | 4.3 km || 
|-id=102 bgcolor=#fefefe
| 56102 ||  || — || January 24, 1999 || Višnjan Observatory || K. Korlević || NYS || align=right | 1.8 km || 
|-id=103 bgcolor=#E9E9E9
| 56103 ||  || — || January 16, 1999 || Socorro || LINEAR || — || align=right | 4.4 km || 
|-id=104 bgcolor=#fefefe
| 56104 ||  || — || January 16, 1999 || Socorro || LINEAR || — || align=right | 5.7 km || 
|-id=105 bgcolor=#fefefe
| 56105 ||  || — || January 16, 1999 || Socorro || LINEAR || V || align=right | 2.3 km || 
|-id=106 bgcolor=#fefefe
| 56106 ||  || — || January 18, 1999 || Socorro || LINEAR || — || align=right | 3.1 km || 
|-id=107 bgcolor=#fefefe
| 56107 ||  || — || January 18, 1999 || Socorro || LINEAR || — || align=right | 3.0 km || 
|-id=108 bgcolor=#fefefe
| 56108 ||  || — || January 16, 1999 || Kitt Peak || Spacewatch || — || align=right | 3.0 km || 
|-id=109 bgcolor=#fefefe
| 56109 ||  || — || January 19, 1999 || Kitt Peak || Spacewatch || — || align=right | 1.8 km || 
|-id=110 bgcolor=#fefefe
| 56110 ||  || — || February 7, 1999 || Oizumi || T. Kobayashi || — || align=right | 2.9 km || 
|-id=111 bgcolor=#E9E9E9
| 56111 ||  || — || February 6, 1999 || Xinglong || SCAP || HNS || align=right | 5.2 km || 
|-id=112 bgcolor=#fefefe
| 56112 ||  || — || February 12, 1999 || Oohira || T. Urata || — || align=right | 5.8 km || 
|-id=113 bgcolor=#fefefe
| 56113 ||  || — || February 12, 1999 || Oizumi || T. Kobayashi || — || align=right | 2.7 km || 
|-id=114 bgcolor=#fefefe
| 56114 ||  || — || February 10, 1999 || Socorro || LINEAR || PHO || align=right | 3.0 km || 
|-id=115 bgcolor=#E9E9E9
| 56115 ||  || — || February 10, 1999 || Socorro || LINEAR || — || align=right | 7.1 km || 
|-id=116 bgcolor=#FA8072
| 56116 ||  || — || February 11, 1999 || Socorro || LINEAR || PHO || align=right | 5.0 km || 
|-id=117 bgcolor=#E9E9E9
| 56117 ||  || — || February 13, 1999 || Reedy Creek || J. Broughton || EUN || align=right | 5.6 km || 
|-id=118 bgcolor=#E9E9E9
| 56118 ||  || — || February 13, 1999 || Višnjan Observatory || K. Korlević || — || align=right | 4.4 km || 
|-id=119 bgcolor=#E9E9E9
| 56119 ||  || — || February 10, 1999 || Socorro || LINEAR || — || align=right | 3.8 km || 
|-id=120 bgcolor=#fefefe
| 56120 ||  || — || February 10, 1999 || Socorro || LINEAR || V || align=right | 2.1 km || 
|-id=121 bgcolor=#E9E9E9
| 56121 ||  || — || February 10, 1999 || Socorro || LINEAR || KRM || align=right | 6.0 km || 
|-id=122 bgcolor=#fefefe
| 56122 ||  || — || February 10, 1999 || Socorro || LINEAR || V || align=right | 2.4 km || 
|-id=123 bgcolor=#fefefe
| 56123 ||  || — || February 10, 1999 || Socorro || LINEAR || V || align=right | 2.2 km || 
|-id=124 bgcolor=#d6d6d6
| 56124 ||  || — || February 10, 1999 || Socorro || LINEAR || BRA || align=right | 3.9 km || 
|-id=125 bgcolor=#fefefe
| 56125 ||  || — || February 10, 1999 || Socorro || LINEAR || — || align=right | 2.6 km || 
|-id=126 bgcolor=#fefefe
| 56126 ||  || — || February 10, 1999 || Socorro || LINEAR || — || align=right | 2.2 km || 
|-id=127 bgcolor=#fefefe
| 56127 ||  || — || February 10, 1999 || Socorro || LINEAR || — || align=right | 2.5 km || 
|-id=128 bgcolor=#E9E9E9
| 56128 ||  || — || February 10, 1999 || Socorro || LINEAR || — || align=right | 4.0 km || 
|-id=129 bgcolor=#E9E9E9
| 56129 ||  || — || February 10, 1999 || Socorro || LINEAR || — || align=right | 4.4 km || 
|-id=130 bgcolor=#fefefe
| 56130 ||  || — || February 10, 1999 || Socorro || LINEAR || NYS || align=right | 3.3 km || 
|-id=131 bgcolor=#fefefe
| 56131 ||  || — || February 10, 1999 || Socorro || LINEAR || — || align=right | 3.8 km || 
|-id=132 bgcolor=#E9E9E9
| 56132 ||  || — || February 10, 1999 || Socorro || LINEAR || ADE || align=right | 8.3 km || 
|-id=133 bgcolor=#E9E9E9
| 56133 ||  || — || February 10, 1999 || Socorro || LINEAR || — || align=right | 2.7 km || 
|-id=134 bgcolor=#E9E9E9
| 56134 ||  || — || February 10, 1999 || Socorro || LINEAR || — || align=right | 3.5 km || 
|-id=135 bgcolor=#E9E9E9
| 56135 ||  || — || February 10, 1999 || Socorro || LINEAR || — || align=right | 2.1 km || 
|-id=136 bgcolor=#fefefe
| 56136 ||  || — || February 10, 1999 || Socorro || LINEAR || — || align=right | 4.1 km || 
|-id=137 bgcolor=#fefefe
| 56137 ||  || — || February 10, 1999 || Socorro || LINEAR || — || align=right | 4.5 km || 
|-id=138 bgcolor=#E9E9E9
| 56138 ||  || — || February 10, 1999 || Socorro || LINEAR || — || align=right | 5.9 km || 
|-id=139 bgcolor=#E9E9E9
| 56139 ||  || — || February 10, 1999 || Socorro || LINEAR || EUN || align=right | 2.6 km || 
|-id=140 bgcolor=#fefefe
| 56140 ||  || — || February 12, 1999 || Socorro || LINEAR || — || align=right | 3.0 km || 
|-id=141 bgcolor=#E9E9E9
| 56141 ||  || — || February 12, 1999 || Socorro || LINEAR || — || align=right | 4.9 km || 
|-id=142 bgcolor=#E9E9E9
| 56142 ||  || — || February 12, 1999 || Socorro || LINEAR || DOR || align=right | 6.2 km || 
|-id=143 bgcolor=#fefefe
| 56143 ||  || — || February 10, 1999 || Socorro || LINEAR || — || align=right | 2.8 km || 
|-id=144 bgcolor=#fefefe
| 56144 ||  || — || February 10, 1999 || Socorro || LINEAR || — || align=right | 3.7 km || 
|-id=145 bgcolor=#fefefe
| 56145 ||  || — || February 10, 1999 || Socorro || LINEAR || — || align=right | 2.7 km || 
|-id=146 bgcolor=#fefefe
| 56146 ||  || — || February 10, 1999 || Socorro || LINEAR || — || align=right | 2.1 km || 
|-id=147 bgcolor=#fefefe
| 56147 ||  || — || February 10, 1999 || Socorro || LINEAR || NYS || align=right | 1.8 km || 
|-id=148 bgcolor=#fefefe
| 56148 ||  || — || February 10, 1999 || Socorro || LINEAR || — || align=right | 2.2 km || 
|-id=149 bgcolor=#E9E9E9
| 56149 ||  || — || February 10, 1999 || Socorro || LINEAR || — || align=right | 2.3 km || 
|-id=150 bgcolor=#fefefe
| 56150 ||  || — || February 12, 1999 || Socorro || LINEAR || — || align=right | 4.7 km || 
|-id=151 bgcolor=#E9E9E9
| 56151 ||  || — || February 12, 1999 || Socorro || LINEAR || — || align=right | 6.3 km || 
|-id=152 bgcolor=#E9E9E9
| 56152 ||  || — || February 12, 1999 || Socorro || LINEAR || — || align=right | 3.9 km || 
|-id=153 bgcolor=#E9E9E9
| 56153 ||  || — || February 12, 1999 || Socorro || LINEAR || — || align=right | 3.1 km || 
|-id=154 bgcolor=#E9E9E9
| 56154 ||  || — || February 11, 1999 || Socorro || LINEAR || EUN || align=right | 5.6 km || 
|-id=155 bgcolor=#fefefe
| 56155 ||  || — || February 11, 1999 || Socorro || LINEAR || — || align=right | 6.9 km || 
|-id=156 bgcolor=#fefefe
| 56156 ||  || — || February 11, 1999 || Socorro || LINEAR || — || align=right | 2.1 km || 
|-id=157 bgcolor=#fefefe
| 56157 ||  || — || February 8, 1999 || Kitt Peak || Spacewatch || NYS || align=right | 3.1 km || 
|-id=158 bgcolor=#E9E9E9
| 56158 ||  || — || February 11, 1999 || Kitt Peak || Spacewatch || — || align=right | 2.3 km || 
|-id=159 bgcolor=#E9E9E9
| 56159 ||  || — || February 9, 1999 || Kitt Peak || Spacewatch || — || align=right | 4.4 km || 
|-id=160 bgcolor=#E9E9E9
| 56160 ||  || — || February 8, 1999 || Kitt Peak || Spacewatch || — || align=right | 8.7 km || 
|-id=161 bgcolor=#E9E9E9
| 56161 ||  || — || February 12, 1999 || Socorro || LINEAR || — || align=right | 6.8 km || 
|-id=162 bgcolor=#E9E9E9
| 56162 ||  || — || February 20, 1999 || Oohira || T. Urata || HNS || align=right | 3.5 km || 
|-id=163 bgcolor=#E9E9E9
| 56163 ||  || — || February 22, 1999 || Prescott || P. G. Comba || — || align=right | 1.9 km || 
|-id=164 bgcolor=#E9E9E9
| 56164 ||  || — || February 18, 1999 || Anderson Mesa || LONEOS || MAR || align=right | 3.4 km || 
|-id=165 bgcolor=#E9E9E9
| 56165 ||  || — || March 8, 1999 || Višnjan Observatory || K. Korlević || — || align=right | 6.9 km || 
|-id=166 bgcolor=#E9E9E9
| 56166 ||  || — || March 14, 1999 || Kitt Peak || Spacewatch || — || align=right | 2.5 km || 
|-id=167 bgcolor=#E9E9E9
| 56167 ||  || — || March 12, 1999 || Socorro || LINEAR || — || align=right | 4.4 km || 
|-id=168 bgcolor=#E9E9E9
| 56168 ||  || — || March 19, 1999 || Farra d'Isonzo || Farra d'Isonzo || — || align=right | 4.5 km || 
|-id=169 bgcolor=#fefefe
| 56169 ||  || — || March 16, 1999 || Caussols || ODAS || V || align=right | 2.4 km || 
|-id=170 bgcolor=#d6d6d6
| 56170 ||  || — || March 17, 1999 || Caussols || ODAS || — || align=right | 6.1 km || 
|-id=171 bgcolor=#E9E9E9
| 56171 ||  || — || March 19, 1999 || Caussols || ODAS || — || align=right | 2.6 km || 
|-id=172 bgcolor=#E9E9E9
| 56172 ||  || — || March 20, 1999 || Caussols || ODAS || — || align=right | 7.7 km || 
|-id=173 bgcolor=#E9E9E9
| 56173 ||  || — || March 22, 1999 || Anderson Mesa || LONEOS || — || align=right | 3.7 km || 
|-id=174 bgcolor=#E9E9E9
| 56174 ||  || — || March 19, 1999 || Kitt Peak || Spacewatch || — || align=right | 2.5 km || 
|-id=175 bgcolor=#E9E9E9
| 56175 ||  || — || March 19, 1999 || Socorro || LINEAR || EUN || align=right | 3.9 km || 
|-id=176 bgcolor=#E9E9E9
| 56176 ||  || — || March 19, 1999 || Socorro || LINEAR || — || align=right | 7.4 km || 
|-id=177 bgcolor=#E9E9E9
| 56177 ||  || — || March 19, 1999 || Socorro || LINEAR || — || align=right | 2.7 km || 
|-id=178 bgcolor=#E9E9E9
| 56178 ||  || — || March 19, 1999 || Socorro || LINEAR || — || align=right | 5.7 km || 
|-id=179 bgcolor=#E9E9E9
| 56179 ||  || — || March 19, 1999 || Socorro || LINEAR || — || align=right | 4.6 km || 
|-id=180 bgcolor=#E9E9E9
| 56180 ||  || — || March 19, 1999 || Socorro || LINEAR || — || align=right | 4.8 km || 
|-id=181 bgcolor=#E9E9E9
| 56181 ||  || — || March 19, 1999 || Socorro || LINEAR || — || align=right | 6.6 km || 
|-id=182 bgcolor=#E9E9E9
| 56182 ||  || — || March 19, 1999 || Socorro || LINEAR || — || align=right | 6.2 km || 
|-id=183 bgcolor=#E9E9E9
| 56183 ||  || — || March 19, 1999 || Socorro || LINEAR || — || align=right | 3.3 km || 
|-id=184 bgcolor=#E9E9E9
| 56184 ||  || — || March 19, 1999 || Socorro || LINEAR || — || align=right | 7.2 km || 
|-id=185 bgcolor=#E9E9E9
| 56185 ||  || — || March 19, 1999 || Socorro || LINEAR || — || align=right | 3.4 km || 
|-id=186 bgcolor=#E9E9E9
| 56186 ||  || — || March 20, 1999 || Socorro || LINEAR || — || align=right | 7.5 km || 
|-id=187 bgcolor=#fefefe
| 56187 ||  || — || March 20, 1999 || Socorro || LINEAR || — || align=right | 1.5 km || 
|-id=188 bgcolor=#E9E9E9
| 56188 ||  || — || March 20, 1999 || Socorro || LINEAR || — || align=right | 2.7 km || 
|-id=189 bgcolor=#E9E9E9
| 56189 ||  || — || March 20, 1999 || Socorro || LINEAR || — || align=right | 4.4 km || 
|-id=190 bgcolor=#d6d6d6
| 56190 ||  || — || March 20, 1999 || Socorro || LINEAR || URS || align=right | 11 km || 
|-id=191 bgcolor=#E9E9E9
| 56191 ||  || — || March 20, 1999 || Socorro || LINEAR || PAD || align=right | 8.9 km || 
|-id=192 bgcolor=#fefefe
| 56192 ||  || — || March 20, 1999 || Socorro || LINEAR || — || align=right | 3.7 km || 
|-id=193 bgcolor=#E9E9E9
| 56193 ||  || — || April 8, 1999 || Oizumi || T. Kobayashi || EUN || align=right | 3.2 km || 
|-id=194 bgcolor=#E9E9E9
| 56194 ||  || — || April 15, 1999 || Reedy Creek || J. Broughton || — || align=right | 6.2 km || 
|-id=195 bgcolor=#E9E9E9
| 56195 ||  || — || April 14, 1999 || Socorro || LINEAR || — || align=right | 9.1 km || 
|-id=196 bgcolor=#fefefe
| 56196 ||  || — || April 13, 1999 || Xinglong || SCAP || V || align=right | 3.2 km || 
|-id=197 bgcolor=#E9E9E9
| 56197 ||  || — || April 9, 1999 || Anderson Mesa || LONEOS || — || align=right | 7.9 km || 
|-id=198 bgcolor=#E9E9E9
| 56198 ||  || — || April 10, 1999 || Anderson Mesa || LONEOS || EUN || align=right | 4.1 km || 
|-id=199 bgcolor=#E9E9E9
| 56199 ||  || — || April 11, 1999 || Kitt Peak || Spacewatch || EUN || align=right | 3.3 km || 
|-id=200 bgcolor=#E9E9E9
| 56200 ||  || — || April 15, 1999 || Socorro || LINEAR || EUN || align=right | 5.5 km || 
|}

56201–56300 

|-bgcolor=#fefefe
| 56201 ||  || — || April 15, 1999 || Socorro || LINEAR || — || align=right | 5.7 km || 
|-id=202 bgcolor=#E9E9E9
| 56202 ||  || — || April 15, 1999 || Socorro || LINEAR || MAR || align=right | 4.5 km || 
|-id=203 bgcolor=#E9E9E9
| 56203 ||  || — || April 15, 1999 || Socorro || LINEAR || MAR || align=right | 4.9 km || 
|-id=204 bgcolor=#E9E9E9
| 56204 ||  || — || April 6, 1999 || Socorro || LINEAR || — || align=right | 4.2 km || 
|-id=205 bgcolor=#E9E9E9
| 56205 ||  || — || April 6, 1999 || Socorro || LINEAR || — || align=right | 3.2 km || 
|-id=206 bgcolor=#E9E9E9
| 56206 ||  || — || April 6, 1999 || Socorro || LINEAR || — || align=right | 4.6 km || 
|-id=207 bgcolor=#E9E9E9
| 56207 ||  || — || April 7, 1999 || Socorro || LINEAR || — || align=right | 4.1 km || 
|-id=208 bgcolor=#d6d6d6
| 56208 ||  || — || April 7, 1999 || Socorro || LINEAR || EOS || align=right | 6.2 km || 
|-id=209 bgcolor=#E9E9E9
| 56209 ||  || — || April 10, 1999 || Socorro || LINEAR || EUN || align=right | 4.0 km || 
|-id=210 bgcolor=#E9E9E9
| 56210 ||  || — || April 12, 1999 || Socorro || LINEAR || — || align=right | 5.4 km || 
|-id=211 bgcolor=#E9E9E9
| 56211 ||  || — || April 12, 1999 || Socorro || LINEAR || — || align=right | 7.6 km || 
|-id=212 bgcolor=#E9E9E9
| 56212 ||  || — || April 12, 1999 || Socorro || LINEAR || EUN || align=right | 4.6 km || 
|-id=213 bgcolor=#E9E9E9
| 56213 ||  || — || April 10, 1999 || Anderson Mesa || LONEOS || AER || align=right | 4.3 km || 
|-id=214 bgcolor=#E9E9E9
| 56214 ||  || — || April 15, 1999 || Socorro || LINEAR || — || align=right | 3.0 km || 
|-id=215 bgcolor=#E9E9E9
| 56215 || 1999 HH || — || April 17, 1999 || Prescott || P. G. Comba || — || align=right | 5.5 km || 
|-id=216 bgcolor=#E9E9E9
| 56216 ||  || — || April 19, 1999 || Majorca || Á. López J., R. Pacheco || — || align=right | 3.2 km || 
|-id=217 bgcolor=#E9E9E9
| 56217 ||  || — || April 25, 1999 || Gekko || T. Kagawa || EUN || align=right | 4.4 km || 
|-id=218 bgcolor=#E9E9E9
| 56218 ||  || — || April 26, 1999 || Woomera || F. B. Zoltowski || — || align=right | 3.2 km || 
|-id=219 bgcolor=#E9E9E9
| 56219 ||  || — || April 19, 1999 || Kitt Peak || Spacewatch || — || align=right | 3.7 km || 
|-id=220 bgcolor=#d6d6d6
| 56220 ||  || — || April 17, 1999 || Socorro || LINEAR || — || align=right | 11 km || 
|-id=221 bgcolor=#d6d6d6
| 56221 ||  || — || May 8, 1999 || Catalina || CSS || EOS || align=right | 4.3 km || 
|-id=222 bgcolor=#d6d6d6
| 56222 ||  || — || May 7, 1999 || Catalina || CSS || — || align=right | 6.5 km || 
|-id=223 bgcolor=#E9E9E9
| 56223 ||  || — || May 8, 1999 || Catalina || CSS || — || align=right | 5.6 km || 
|-id=224 bgcolor=#E9E9E9
| 56224 ||  || — || May 13, 1999 || Socorro || LINEAR || — || align=right | 4.9 km || 
|-id=225 bgcolor=#E9E9E9
| 56225 ||  || — || May 10, 1999 || Socorro || LINEAR || — || align=right | 3.8 km || 
|-id=226 bgcolor=#E9E9E9
| 56226 ||  || — || May 10, 1999 || Socorro || LINEAR || HNA || align=right | 5.7 km || 
|-id=227 bgcolor=#E9E9E9
| 56227 ||  || — || May 10, 1999 || Socorro || LINEAR || PAD || align=right | 7.3 km || 
|-id=228 bgcolor=#E9E9E9
| 56228 ||  || — || May 10, 1999 || Socorro || LINEAR || — || align=right | 4.7 km || 
|-id=229 bgcolor=#E9E9E9
| 56229 ||  || — || May 10, 1999 || Socorro || LINEAR || — || align=right | 4.6 km || 
|-id=230 bgcolor=#E9E9E9
| 56230 ||  || — || May 10, 1999 || Socorro || LINEAR || — || align=right | 3.4 km || 
|-id=231 bgcolor=#E9E9E9
| 56231 ||  || — || May 10, 1999 || Socorro || LINEAR || — || align=right | 5.6 km || 
|-id=232 bgcolor=#fefefe
| 56232 ||  || — || May 10, 1999 || Socorro || LINEAR || — || align=right | 2.6 km || 
|-id=233 bgcolor=#E9E9E9
| 56233 ||  || — || May 10, 1999 || Socorro || LINEAR || WAT || align=right | 5.3 km || 
|-id=234 bgcolor=#d6d6d6
| 56234 ||  || — || May 10, 1999 || Socorro || LINEAR || KOR || align=right | 3.5 km || 
|-id=235 bgcolor=#E9E9E9
| 56235 ||  || — || May 10, 1999 || Socorro || LINEAR || — || align=right | 3.9 km || 
|-id=236 bgcolor=#E9E9E9
| 56236 ||  || — || May 10, 1999 || Socorro || LINEAR || — || align=right | 5.7 km || 
|-id=237 bgcolor=#E9E9E9
| 56237 ||  || — || May 10, 1999 || Socorro || LINEAR || — || align=right | 6.2 km || 
|-id=238 bgcolor=#E9E9E9
| 56238 ||  || — || May 10, 1999 || Socorro || LINEAR || — || align=right | 3.0 km || 
|-id=239 bgcolor=#d6d6d6
| 56239 ||  || — || May 10, 1999 || Socorro || LINEAR || — || align=right | 4.0 km || 
|-id=240 bgcolor=#E9E9E9
| 56240 ||  || — || May 10, 1999 || Socorro || LINEAR || — || align=right | 4.1 km || 
|-id=241 bgcolor=#E9E9E9
| 56241 ||  || — || May 10, 1999 || Socorro || LINEAR || — || align=right | 4.6 km || 
|-id=242 bgcolor=#E9E9E9
| 56242 ||  || — || May 10, 1999 || Socorro || LINEAR || — || align=right | 5.1 km || 
|-id=243 bgcolor=#d6d6d6
| 56243 ||  || — || May 10, 1999 || Socorro || LINEAR || — || align=right | 8.8 km || 
|-id=244 bgcolor=#E9E9E9
| 56244 ||  || — || May 10, 1999 || Socorro || LINEAR || — || align=right | 3.4 km || 
|-id=245 bgcolor=#E9E9E9
| 56245 ||  || — || May 12, 1999 || Socorro || LINEAR || — || align=right | 6.4 km || 
|-id=246 bgcolor=#E9E9E9
| 56246 ||  || — || May 12, 1999 || Socorro || LINEAR || — || align=right | 4.2 km || 
|-id=247 bgcolor=#E9E9E9
| 56247 ||  || — || May 12, 1999 || Socorro || LINEAR || — || align=right | 2.9 km || 
|-id=248 bgcolor=#E9E9E9
| 56248 ||  || — || May 12, 1999 || Socorro || LINEAR || — || align=right | 2.8 km || 
|-id=249 bgcolor=#E9E9E9
| 56249 ||  || — || May 12, 1999 || Socorro || LINEAR || — || align=right | 9.5 km || 
|-id=250 bgcolor=#E9E9E9
| 56250 ||  || — || May 10, 1999 || Socorro || LINEAR || — || align=right | 3.0 km || 
|-id=251 bgcolor=#E9E9E9
| 56251 ||  || — || May 12, 1999 || Socorro || LINEAR || — || align=right | 4.5 km || 
|-id=252 bgcolor=#E9E9E9
| 56252 ||  || — || May 13, 1999 || Socorro || LINEAR || — || align=right | 5.1 km || 
|-id=253 bgcolor=#E9E9E9
| 56253 ||  || — || May 13, 1999 || Socorro || LINEAR || GER || align=right | 4.3 km || 
|-id=254 bgcolor=#E9E9E9
| 56254 ||  || — || May 12, 1999 || Socorro || LINEAR || EUN || align=right | 3.4 km || 
|-id=255 bgcolor=#E9E9E9
| 56255 ||  || — || May 12, 1999 || Socorro || LINEAR || DOR || align=right | 6.9 km || 
|-id=256 bgcolor=#E9E9E9
| 56256 ||  || — || May 12, 1999 || Socorro || LINEAR || — || align=right | 6.0 km || 
|-id=257 bgcolor=#E9E9E9
| 56257 ||  || — || May 12, 1999 || Socorro || LINEAR || — || align=right | 7.2 km || 
|-id=258 bgcolor=#E9E9E9
| 56258 ||  || — || May 12, 1999 || Socorro || LINEAR || — || align=right | 3.9 km || 
|-id=259 bgcolor=#E9E9E9
| 56259 ||  || — || May 12, 1999 || Socorro || LINEAR || ADE || align=right | 4.9 km || 
|-id=260 bgcolor=#E9E9E9
| 56260 ||  || — || May 12, 1999 || Socorro || LINEAR || — || align=right | 4.1 km || 
|-id=261 bgcolor=#E9E9E9
| 56261 ||  || — || May 12, 1999 || Socorro || LINEAR || ADE || align=right | 6.4 km || 
|-id=262 bgcolor=#E9E9E9
| 56262 ||  || — || May 12, 1999 || Socorro || LINEAR || — || align=right | 4.1 km || 
|-id=263 bgcolor=#E9E9E9
| 56263 ||  || — || May 12, 1999 || Socorro || LINEAR || WAT || align=right | 6.8 km || 
|-id=264 bgcolor=#d6d6d6
| 56264 ||  || — || May 12, 1999 || Socorro || LINEAR || EOS || align=right | 4.6 km || 
|-id=265 bgcolor=#d6d6d6
| 56265 ||  || — || May 12, 1999 || Socorro || LINEAR || — || align=right | 7.5 km || 
|-id=266 bgcolor=#d6d6d6
| 56266 ||  || — || May 12, 1999 || Socorro || LINEAR || — || align=right | 5.3 km || 
|-id=267 bgcolor=#d6d6d6
| 56267 ||  || — || May 12, 1999 || Socorro || LINEAR || — || align=right | 3.3 km || 
|-id=268 bgcolor=#E9E9E9
| 56268 ||  || — || May 12, 1999 || Socorro || LINEAR || — || align=right | 4.4 km || 
|-id=269 bgcolor=#E9E9E9
| 56269 ||  || — || May 12, 1999 || Socorro || LINEAR || DOR || align=right | 6.5 km || 
|-id=270 bgcolor=#d6d6d6
| 56270 ||  || — || May 12, 1999 || Socorro || LINEAR || EOS || align=right | 4.1 km || 
|-id=271 bgcolor=#fefefe
| 56271 ||  || — || May 13, 1999 || Socorro || LINEAR || — || align=right | 3.1 km || 
|-id=272 bgcolor=#d6d6d6
| 56272 ||  || — || May 13, 1999 || Socorro || LINEAR || — || align=right | 5.4 km || 
|-id=273 bgcolor=#E9E9E9
| 56273 ||  || — || May 14, 1999 || Socorro || LINEAR || — || align=right | 5.0 km || 
|-id=274 bgcolor=#E9E9E9
| 56274 ||  || — || May 15, 1999 || Socorro || LINEAR || — || align=right | 7.1 km || 
|-id=275 bgcolor=#d6d6d6
| 56275 ||  || — || May 13, 1999 || Socorro || LINEAR || — || align=right | 5.9 km || 
|-id=276 bgcolor=#E9E9E9
| 56276 ||  || — || May 14, 1999 || Socorro || LINEAR || — || align=right | 5.4 km || 
|-id=277 bgcolor=#E9E9E9
| 56277 ||  || — || May 12, 1999 || Socorro || LINEAR || — || align=right | 4.6 km || 
|-id=278 bgcolor=#d6d6d6
| 56278 || 1999 KB || — || May 16, 1999 || Woomera || F. B. Zoltowski || — || align=right | 5.9 km || 
|-id=279 bgcolor=#E9E9E9
| 56279 ||  || — || May 17, 1999 || Catalina || CSS || PAE || align=right | 5.3 km || 
|-id=280 bgcolor=#E9E9E9
| 56280 Asemo ||  ||  || May 22, 1999 || Oaxaca || J. M. Roe || — || align=right | 4.1 km || 
|-id=281 bgcolor=#E9E9E9
| 56281 ||  || — || May 18, 1999 || Socorro || LINEAR || — || align=right | 5.1 km || 
|-id=282 bgcolor=#E9E9E9
| 56282 ||  || — || May 18, 1999 || Socorro || LINEAR || EUN || align=right | 4.0 km || 
|-id=283 bgcolor=#fefefe
| 56283 ||  || — || June 4, 1999 || Socorro || LINEAR || PHO || align=right | 3.8 km || 
|-id=284 bgcolor=#E9E9E9
| 56284 ||  || — || June 5, 1999 || Nachi-Katsuura || Y. Shimizu, T. Urata || — || align=right | 8.1 km || 
|-id=285 bgcolor=#d6d6d6
| 56285 ||  || — || June 6, 1999 || Kitt Peak || Spacewatch || KAR || align=right | 3.3 km || 
|-id=286 bgcolor=#d6d6d6
| 56286 ||  || — || June 8, 1999 || Socorro || LINEAR || EUP || align=right | 11 km || 
|-id=287 bgcolor=#d6d6d6
| 56287 ||  || — || June 8, 1999 || Socorro || LINEAR || — || align=right | 3.7 km || 
|-id=288 bgcolor=#E9E9E9
| 56288 ||  || — || June 9, 1999 || Socorro || LINEAR || — || align=right | 6.2 km || 
|-id=289 bgcolor=#fefefe
| 56289 ||  || — || June 9, 1999 || Socorro || LINEAR || PHO || align=right | 2.6 km || 
|-id=290 bgcolor=#d6d6d6
| 56290 ||  || — || June 8, 1999 || Catalina || CSS || — || align=right | 7.7 km || 
|-id=291 bgcolor=#E9E9E9
| 56291 ||  || — || July 13, 1999 || Socorro || LINEAR || — || align=right | 4.1 km || 
|-id=292 bgcolor=#fefefe
| 56292 ||  || — || July 14, 1999 || Socorro || LINEAR || — || align=right | 3.3 km || 
|-id=293 bgcolor=#E9E9E9
| 56293 ||  || — || July 13, 1999 || Socorro || LINEAR || — || align=right | 4.6 km || 
|-id=294 bgcolor=#d6d6d6
| 56294 ||  || — || July 13, 1999 || Socorro || LINEAR || — || align=right | 5.8 km || 
|-id=295 bgcolor=#fefefe
| 56295 ||  || — || July 12, 1999 || Socorro || LINEAR || — || align=right | 2.9 km || 
|-id=296 bgcolor=#fefefe
| 56296 ||  || — || September 7, 1999 || Catalina || CSS || — || align=right | 2.8 km || 
|-id=297 bgcolor=#d6d6d6
| 56297 ||  || — || September 12, 1999 || Črni Vrh || Črni Vrh || LUT || align=right | 13 km || 
|-id=298 bgcolor=#d6d6d6
| 56298 ||  || — || September 7, 1999 || Socorro || LINEAR || TIR || align=right | 8.6 km || 
|-id=299 bgcolor=#d6d6d6
| 56299 ||  || — || September 7, 1999 || Socorro || LINEAR || — || align=right | 11 km || 
|-id=300 bgcolor=#d6d6d6
| 56300 ||  || — || September 7, 1999 || Socorro || LINEAR || — || align=right | 6.9 km || 
|}

56301–56400 

|-bgcolor=#d6d6d6
| 56301 ||  || — || September 7, 1999 || Socorro || LINEAR || — || align=right | 8.7 km || 
|-id=302 bgcolor=#E9E9E9
| 56302 ||  || — || September 7, 1999 || Socorro || LINEAR || HEN || align=right | 2.2 km || 
|-id=303 bgcolor=#d6d6d6
| 56303 ||  || — || September 7, 1999 || Socorro || LINEAR || — || align=right | 10 km || 
|-id=304 bgcolor=#d6d6d6
| 56304 ||  || — || September 9, 1999 || Socorro || LINEAR || AEG || align=right | 11 km || 
|-id=305 bgcolor=#d6d6d6
| 56305 ||  || — || September 9, 1999 || Socorro || LINEAR || — || align=right | 8.0 km || 
|-id=306 bgcolor=#d6d6d6
| 56306 ||  || — || September 9, 1999 || Socorro || LINEAR || URS || align=right | 11 km || 
|-id=307 bgcolor=#d6d6d6
| 56307 ||  || — || September 9, 1999 || Socorro || LINEAR || TIR || align=right | 5.7 km || 
|-id=308 bgcolor=#fefefe
| 56308 ||  || — || September 9, 1999 || Socorro || LINEAR || FLO || align=right | 2.4 km || 
|-id=309 bgcolor=#fefefe
| 56309 ||  || — || September 9, 1999 || Socorro || LINEAR || — || align=right | 2.0 km || 
|-id=310 bgcolor=#E9E9E9
| 56310 ||  || — || September 9, 1999 || Socorro || LINEAR || — || align=right | 5.1 km || 
|-id=311 bgcolor=#fefefe
| 56311 ||  || — || September 5, 1999 || Anderson Mesa || LONEOS || — || align=right | 1.4 km || 
|-id=312 bgcolor=#d6d6d6
| 56312 ||  || — || September 7, 1999 || Anderson Mesa || LONEOS || — || align=right | 11 km || 
|-id=313 bgcolor=#d6d6d6
| 56313 ||  || — || September 29, 1999 || Catalina || CSS || EUP || align=right | 9.6 km || 
|-id=314 bgcolor=#d6d6d6
| 56314 ||  || — || October 2, 1999 || Socorro || LINEAR || — || align=right | 9.3 km || 
|-id=315 bgcolor=#E9E9E9
| 56315 ||  || — || October 4, 1999 || Socorro || LINEAR || VIB || align=right | 4.1 km || 
|-id=316 bgcolor=#fefefe
| 56316 ||  || — || October 4, 1999 || Catalina || CSS || — || align=right | 2.2 km || 
|-id=317 bgcolor=#d6d6d6
| 56317 ||  || — || October 5, 1999 || Anderson Mesa || LONEOS || — || align=right | 6.2 km || 
|-id=318 bgcolor=#fefefe
| 56318 ||  || — || October 20, 1999 || La Silla || T. Kranz, C. Wolf || H || align=right | 2.3 km || 
|-id=319 bgcolor=#fefefe
| 56319 ||  || — || October 31, 1999 || Socorro || LINEAR || H || align=right | 1.6 km || 
|-id=320 bgcolor=#fefefe
| 56320 ||  || — || November 3, 1999 || Socorro || LINEAR || — || align=right | 1.9 km || 
|-id=321 bgcolor=#fefefe
| 56321 ||  || — || November 3, 1999 || Socorro || LINEAR || H || align=right | 3.1 km || 
|-id=322 bgcolor=#fefefe
| 56322 ||  || — || November 4, 1999 || Socorro || LINEAR || NYS || align=right | 1.5 km || 
|-id=323 bgcolor=#d6d6d6
| 56323 ||  || — || November 5, 1999 || Socorro || LINEAR || — || align=right | 13 km || 
|-id=324 bgcolor=#d6d6d6
| 56324 ||  || — || November 2, 1999 || Catalina || CSS || — || align=right | 13 km || 
|-id=325 bgcolor=#d6d6d6
| 56325 ||  || — || November 6, 1999 || Socorro || LINEAR || MEL || align=right | 12 km || 
|-id=326 bgcolor=#d6d6d6
| 56326 ||  || — || November 9, 1999 || Anderson Mesa || LONEOS || ALA || align=right | 19 km || 
|-id=327 bgcolor=#d6d6d6
| 56327 ||  || — || November 3, 1999 || Socorro || LINEAR || — || align=right | 9.7 km || 
|-id=328 bgcolor=#fefefe
| 56328 || 1999 WE || — || November 17, 1999 || High Point || D. K. Chesney || H || align=right | 1.4 km || 
|-id=329 bgcolor=#fefefe
| 56329 Tarxien ||  ||  || November 28, 1999 || Kleť || J. Tichá, M. Tichý || V || align=right | 1.1 km || 
|-id=330 bgcolor=#fefefe
| 56330 ||  || — || December 5, 1999 || Socorro || LINEAR || — || align=right | 2.7 km || 
|-id=331 bgcolor=#fefefe
| 56331 ||  || — || December 6, 1999 || Socorro || LINEAR || — || align=right | 5.2 km || 
|-id=332 bgcolor=#fefefe
| 56332 ||  || — || December 6, 1999 || Socorro || LINEAR || — || align=right | 2.0 km || 
|-id=333 bgcolor=#fefefe
| 56333 ||  || — || December 7, 1999 || Socorro || LINEAR || NYS || align=right | 6.7 km || 
|-id=334 bgcolor=#fefefe
| 56334 ||  || — || December 7, 1999 || Socorro || LINEAR || H || align=right | 1.6 km || 
|-id=335 bgcolor=#E9E9E9
| 56335 ||  || — || December 8, 1999 || Catalina || CSS || EUN || align=right | 5.3 km || 
|-id=336 bgcolor=#fefefe
| 56336 ||  || — || December 7, 1999 || Catalina || CSS || — || align=right | 2.4 km || 
|-id=337 bgcolor=#fefefe
| 56337 ||  || — || December 13, 1999 || Socorro || LINEAR || H || align=right | 1.9 km || 
|-id=338 bgcolor=#fefefe
| 56338 ||  || — || December 8, 1999 || Catalina || CSS || H || align=right | 2.0 km || 
|-id=339 bgcolor=#fefefe
| 56339 ||  || — || December 10, 1999 || Socorro || LINEAR || — || align=right | 2.0 km || 
|-id=340 bgcolor=#fefefe
| 56340 ||  || — || December 10, 1999 || Socorro || LINEAR || — || align=right | 2.8 km || 
|-id=341 bgcolor=#d6d6d6
| 56341 ||  || — || December 15, 1999 || Socorro || LINEAR || SYL7:4 || align=right | 12 km || 
|-id=342 bgcolor=#fefefe
| 56342 ||  || — || December 5, 1999 || Kitt Peak || Spacewatch || — || align=right | 1.6 km || 
|-id=343 bgcolor=#fefefe
| 56343 || 1999 YG || — || December 16, 1999 || Socorro || LINEAR || H || align=right | 2.0 km || 
|-id=344 bgcolor=#fefefe
| 56344 ||  || — || December 29, 1999 || Socorro || LINEAR || H || align=right | 1.4 km || 
|-id=345 bgcolor=#fefefe
| 56345 ||  || — || January 3, 2000 || Socorro || LINEAR || — || align=right | 2.0 km || 
|-id=346 bgcolor=#fefefe
| 56346 ||  || — || January 4, 2000 || Socorro || LINEAR || V || align=right | 1.8 km || 
|-id=347 bgcolor=#E9E9E9
| 56347 ||  || — || January 4, 2000 || Socorro || LINEAR || — || align=right | 5.2 km || 
|-id=348 bgcolor=#fefefe
| 56348 ||  || — || January 5, 2000 || Socorro || LINEAR || FLO || align=right | 2.0 km || 
|-id=349 bgcolor=#fefefe
| 56349 ||  || — || January 5, 2000 || Socorro || LINEAR || ERI || align=right | 4.6 km || 
|-id=350 bgcolor=#E9E9E9
| 56350 ||  || — || January 5, 2000 || Socorro || LINEAR || — || align=right | 6.2 km || 
|-id=351 bgcolor=#fefefe
| 56351 ||  || — || January 4, 2000 || Socorro || LINEAR || H || align=right | 1.9 km || 
|-id=352 bgcolor=#fefefe
| 56352 ||  || — || January 6, 2000 || Socorro || LINEAR || H || align=right | 1.6 km || 
|-id=353 bgcolor=#E9E9E9
| 56353 ||  || — || January 5, 2000 || Socorro || LINEAR || — || align=right | 6.3 km || 
|-id=354 bgcolor=#fefefe
| 56354 ||  || — || January 5, 2000 || Socorro || LINEAR || FLO || align=right | 2.3 km || 
|-id=355 bgcolor=#C2FFFF
| 56355 ||  || — || January 6, 2000 || Socorro || LINEAR || L4 || align=right | 18 km || 
|-id=356 bgcolor=#E9E9E9
| 56356 ||  || — || January 5, 2000 || Socorro || LINEAR || — || align=right | 3.3 km || 
|-id=357 bgcolor=#fefefe
| 56357 ||  || — || January 5, 2000 || Socorro || LINEAR || — || align=right | 1.5 km || 
|-id=358 bgcolor=#fefefe
| 56358 ||  || — || January 9, 2000 || Socorro || LINEAR || H || align=right | 1.5 km || 
|-id=359 bgcolor=#E9E9E9
| 56359 ||  || — || January 7, 2000 || Anderson Mesa || LONEOS || — || align=right | 4.8 km || 
|-id=360 bgcolor=#fefefe
| 56360 ||  || — || January 6, 2000 || Socorro || LINEAR || H || align=right | 2.2 km || 
|-id=361 bgcolor=#fefefe
| 56361 ||  || — || February 4, 2000 || San Marcello || A. Boattini, M. Tombelli || — || align=right | 2.7 km || 
|-id=362 bgcolor=#fefefe
| 56362 ||  || — || February 4, 2000 || Socorro || LINEAR || — || align=right | 1.8 km || 
|-id=363 bgcolor=#E9E9E9
| 56363 ||  || — || February 8, 2000 || Socorro || LINEAR || — || align=right | 3.2 km || 
|-id=364 bgcolor=#fefefe
| 56364 ||  || — || February 3, 2000 || Socorro || LINEAR || V || align=right | 1.6 km || 
|-id=365 bgcolor=#fefefe
| 56365 ||  || — || February 29, 2000 || Socorro || LINEAR || — || align=right | 3.7 km || 
|-id=366 bgcolor=#fefefe
| 56366 ||  || — || February 29, 2000 || Socorro || LINEAR || — || align=right | 1.7 km || 
|-id=367 bgcolor=#E9E9E9
| 56367 || 2000 EF || — || March 1, 2000 || Oizumi || T. Kobayashi || — || align=right | 6.4 km || 
|-id=368 bgcolor=#fefefe
| 56368 ||  || — || March 2, 2000 || Kitt Peak || Spacewatch || — || align=right | 1.7 km || 
|-id=369 bgcolor=#fefefe
| 56369 ||  || — || March 2, 2000 || Kitt Peak || Spacewatch || FLO || align=right | 1.9 km || 
|-id=370 bgcolor=#fefefe
| 56370 ||  || — || March 2, 2000 || Višnjan Observatory || K. Korlević || V || align=right | 2.2 km || 
|-id=371 bgcolor=#fefefe
| 56371 ||  || — || March 5, 2000 || Reedy Creek || J. Broughton || — || align=right | 3.5 km || 
|-id=372 bgcolor=#fefefe
| 56372 ||  || — || March 7, 2000 || Socorro || LINEAR || — || align=right | 2.4 km || 
|-id=373 bgcolor=#fefefe
| 56373 ||  || — || March 1, 2000 || Catalina || CSS || — || align=right | 2.1 km || 
|-id=374 bgcolor=#fefefe
| 56374 ||  || — || March 8, 2000 || Kitt Peak || Spacewatch || FLO || align=right | 1.6 km || 
|-id=375 bgcolor=#fefefe
| 56375 ||  || — || March 8, 2000 || Kitt Peak || Spacewatch || — || align=right | 3.0 km || 
|-id=376 bgcolor=#fefefe
| 56376 ||  || — || March 5, 2000 || Socorro || LINEAR || V || align=right | 2.1 km || 
|-id=377 bgcolor=#fefefe
| 56377 ||  || — || March 8, 2000 || Socorro || LINEAR || — || align=right | 2.2 km || 
|-id=378 bgcolor=#fefefe
| 56378 ||  || — || March 8, 2000 || Socorro || LINEAR || — || align=right | 2.2 km || 
|-id=379 bgcolor=#fefefe
| 56379 ||  || — || March 8, 2000 || Socorro || LINEAR || FLO || align=right | 1.9 km || 
|-id=380 bgcolor=#fefefe
| 56380 ||  || — || March 8, 2000 || Socorro || LINEAR || — || align=right | 1.6 km || 
|-id=381 bgcolor=#fefefe
| 56381 ||  || — || March 8, 2000 || Socorro || LINEAR || — || align=right | 1.7 km || 
|-id=382 bgcolor=#fefefe
| 56382 ||  || — || March 8, 2000 || Socorro || LINEAR || V || align=right | 1.6 km || 
|-id=383 bgcolor=#fefefe
| 56383 ||  || — || March 9, 2000 || Socorro || LINEAR || FLO || align=right | 2.0 km || 
|-id=384 bgcolor=#fefefe
| 56384 ||  || — || March 9, 2000 || Socorro || LINEAR || V || align=right | 2.2 km || 
|-id=385 bgcolor=#fefefe
| 56385 ||  || — || March 9, 2000 || Socorro || LINEAR || — || align=right | 1.8 km || 
|-id=386 bgcolor=#fefefe
| 56386 ||  || — || March 9, 2000 || Kitt Peak || Spacewatch || — || align=right | 1.9 km || 
|-id=387 bgcolor=#fefefe
| 56387 ||  || — || March 10, 2000 || Socorro || LINEAR || FLO || align=right | 1.8 km || 
|-id=388 bgcolor=#fefefe
| 56388 ||  || — || March 10, 2000 || Socorro || LINEAR || — || align=right | 2.3 km || 
|-id=389 bgcolor=#fefefe
| 56389 ||  || — || March 8, 2000 || Socorro || LINEAR || FLO || align=right | 1.6 km || 
|-id=390 bgcolor=#fefefe
| 56390 ||  || — || March 9, 2000 || Socorro || LINEAR || FLO || align=right | 2.3 km || 
|-id=391 bgcolor=#fefefe
| 56391 ||  || — || March 11, 2000 || Socorro || LINEAR || — || align=right | 2.3 km || 
|-id=392 bgcolor=#fefefe
| 56392 ||  || — || March 15, 2000 || Reedy Creek || J. Broughton || FLO || align=right | 1.7 km || 
|-id=393 bgcolor=#fefefe
| 56393 ||  || — || March 11, 2000 || Anderson Mesa || LONEOS || — || align=right | 2.2 km || 
|-id=394 bgcolor=#fefefe
| 56394 ||  || — || March 11, 2000 || Anderson Mesa || LONEOS || V || align=right | 1.8 km || 
|-id=395 bgcolor=#fefefe
| 56395 ||  || — || March 11, 2000 || Anderson Mesa || LONEOS || FLO || align=right | 2.4 km || 
|-id=396 bgcolor=#fefefe
| 56396 ||  || — || March 11, 2000 || Anderson Mesa || LONEOS || KLI || align=right | 7.4 km || 
|-id=397 bgcolor=#fefefe
| 56397 ||  || — || March 11, 2000 || Anderson Mesa || LONEOS || — || align=right | 2.2 km || 
|-id=398 bgcolor=#fefefe
| 56398 ||  || — || March 11, 2000 || Anderson Mesa || LONEOS || FLO || align=right | 1.8 km || 
|-id=399 bgcolor=#fefefe
| 56399 ||  || — || March 11, 2000 || Anderson Mesa || LONEOS || — || align=right | 3.2 km || 
|-id=400 bgcolor=#d6d6d6
| 56400 ||  || — || March 5, 2000 || Socorro || LINEAR || — || align=right | 6.7 km || 
|}

56401–56500 

|-bgcolor=#fefefe
| 56401 ||  || — || March 9, 2000 || Socorro || LINEAR || — || align=right | 5.4 km || 
|-id=402 bgcolor=#fefefe
| 56402 ||  || — || March 12, 2000 || Anderson Mesa || LONEOS || V || align=right | 2.2 km || 
|-id=403 bgcolor=#fefefe
| 56403 || 2000 FL || — || March 25, 2000 || Oizumi || T. Kobayashi || FLO || align=right | 2.2 km || 
|-id=404 bgcolor=#fefefe
| 56404 ||  || — || March 28, 2000 || Socorro || LINEAR || — || align=right | 4.2 km || 
|-id=405 bgcolor=#fefefe
| 56405 ||  || — || March 28, 2000 || Socorro || LINEAR || FLO || align=right | 1.9 km || 
|-id=406 bgcolor=#fefefe
| 56406 ||  || — || March 29, 2000 || Socorro || LINEAR || — || align=right | 2.7 km || 
|-id=407 bgcolor=#fefefe
| 56407 ||  || — || March 29, 2000 || Socorro || LINEAR || — || align=right | 1.8 km || 
|-id=408 bgcolor=#fefefe
| 56408 ||  || — || March 29, 2000 || Socorro || LINEAR || — || align=right | 1.8 km || 
|-id=409 bgcolor=#fefefe
| 56409 ||  || — || March 27, 2000 || Anderson Mesa || LONEOS || — || align=right | 1.3 km || 
|-id=410 bgcolor=#fefefe
| 56410 ||  || — || March 29, 2000 || Socorro || LINEAR || — || align=right | 1.6 km || 
|-id=411 bgcolor=#fefefe
| 56411 ||  || — || March 29, 2000 || Socorro || LINEAR || — || align=right | 2.1 km || 
|-id=412 bgcolor=#fefefe
| 56412 ||  || — || March 29, 2000 || Socorro || LINEAR || V || align=right | 1.9 km || 
|-id=413 bgcolor=#fefefe
| 56413 ||  || — || March 29, 2000 || Socorro || LINEAR || — || align=right | 3.1 km || 
|-id=414 bgcolor=#fefefe
| 56414 ||  || — || March 29, 2000 || Socorro || LINEAR || — || align=right | 1.8 km || 
|-id=415 bgcolor=#fefefe
| 56415 ||  || — || March 29, 2000 || Socorro || LINEAR || — || align=right | 2.4 km || 
|-id=416 bgcolor=#fefefe
| 56416 ||  || — || March 29, 2000 || Socorro || LINEAR || — || align=right | 1.8 km || 
|-id=417 bgcolor=#fefefe
| 56417 ||  || — || March 26, 2000 || Anderson Mesa || LONEOS || V || align=right | 1.8 km || 
|-id=418 bgcolor=#fefefe
| 56418 ||  || — || March 29, 2000 || Socorro || LINEAR || — || align=right | 1.7 km || 
|-id=419 bgcolor=#fefefe
| 56419 ||  || — || March 29, 2000 || Socorro || LINEAR || — || align=right | 1.7 km || 
|-id=420 bgcolor=#fefefe
| 56420 ||  || — || March 29, 2000 || Socorro || LINEAR || V || align=right | 1.6 km || 
|-id=421 bgcolor=#fefefe
| 56421 ||  || — || April 3, 2000 || Socorro || LINEAR || — || align=right | 2.2 km || 
|-id=422 bgcolor=#fefefe
| 56422 Mnajdra ||  ||  || April 2, 2000 || Kleť || J. Tichá, M. Tichý || NYS || align=right | 2.5 km || 
|-id=423 bgcolor=#fefefe
| 56423 ||  || — || April 2, 2000 || Kleť || Kleť Obs. || — || align=right | 2.4 km || 
|-id=424 bgcolor=#fefefe
| 56424 ||  || — || April 4, 2000 || Socorro || LINEAR || — || align=right | 2.4 km || 
|-id=425 bgcolor=#fefefe
| 56425 ||  || — || April 4, 2000 || Socorro || LINEAR || — || align=right | 3.7 km || 
|-id=426 bgcolor=#fefefe
| 56426 ||  || — || April 5, 2000 || Socorro || LINEAR || — || align=right | 1.9 km || 
|-id=427 bgcolor=#d6d6d6
| 56427 ||  || — || April 5, 2000 || Socorro || LINEAR || KOR || align=right | 2.9 km || 
|-id=428 bgcolor=#fefefe
| 56428 ||  || — || April 5, 2000 || Socorro || LINEAR || — || align=right | 2.3 km || 
|-id=429 bgcolor=#fefefe
| 56429 ||  || — || April 5, 2000 || Socorro || LINEAR || — || align=right | 1.6 km || 
|-id=430 bgcolor=#fefefe
| 56430 ||  || — || April 5, 2000 || Socorro || LINEAR || NYS || align=right | 2.0 km || 
|-id=431 bgcolor=#fefefe
| 56431 ||  || — || April 5, 2000 || Socorro || LINEAR || NYS || align=right | 2.0 km || 
|-id=432 bgcolor=#fefefe
| 56432 ||  || — || April 5, 2000 || Socorro || LINEAR || NYS || align=right | 1.8 km || 
|-id=433 bgcolor=#fefefe
| 56433 ||  || — || April 12, 2000 || Socorro || LINEAR || — || align=right | 7.4 km || 
|-id=434 bgcolor=#fefefe
| 56434 ||  || — || April 5, 2000 || Socorro || LINEAR || NYS || align=right | 3.8 km || 
|-id=435 bgcolor=#fefefe
| 56435 ||  || — || April 5, 2000 || Socorro || LINEAR || NYS || align=right | 2.5 km || 
|-id=436 bgcolor=#fefefe
| 56436 ||  || — || April 5, 2000 || Socorro || LINEAR || FLO || align=right | 2.6 km || 
|-id=437 bgcolor=#fefefe
| 56437 ||  || — || April 5, 2000 || Socorro || LINEAR || V || align=right | 1.8 km || 
|-id=438 bgcolor=#fefefe
| 56438 ||  || — || April 5, 2000 || Socorro || LINEAR || V || align=right | 1.9 km || 
|-id=439 bgcolor=#fefefe
| 56439 ||  || — || April 5, 2000 || Socorro || LINEAR || — || align=right | 2.7 km || 
|-id=440 bgcolor=#fefefe
| 56440 ||  || — || April 5, 2000 || Socorro || LINEAR || — || align=right | 1.9 km || 
|-id=441 bgcolor=#fefefe
| 56441 ||  || — || April 5, 2000 || Socorro || LINEAR || FLO || align=right | 1.7 km || 
|-id=442 bgcolor=#E9E9E9
| 56442 ||  || — || April 5, 2000 || Socorro || LINEAR || — || align=right | 5.0 km || 
|-id=443 bgcolor=#fefefe
| 56443 ||  || — || April 5, 2000 || Socorro || LINEAR || — || align=right | 2.4 km || 
|-id=444 bgcolor=#fefefe
| 56444 ||  || — || April 5, 2000 || Socorro || LINEAR || EUT || align=right | 2.3 km || 
|-id=445 bgcolor=#fefefe
| 56445 ||  || — || April 5, 2000 || Socorro || LINEAR || — || align=right | 2.2 km || 
|-id=446 bgcolor=#fefefe
| 56446 ||  || — || April 5, 2000 || Socorro || LINEAR || — || align=right | 4.4 km || 
|-id=447 bgcolor=#fefefe
| 56447 ||  || — || April 5, 2000 || Socorro || LINEAR || FLO || align=right | 1.8 km || 
|-id=448 bgcolor=#fefefe
| 56448 ||  || — || April 5, 2000 || Socorro || LINEAR || — || align=right | 1.8 km || 
|-id=449 bgcolor=#fefefe
| 56449 ||  || — || April 5, 2000 || Socorro || LINEAR || — || align=right | 1.5 km || 
|-id=450 bgcolor=#E9E9E9
| 56450 ||  || — || April 7, 2000 || Socorro || LINEAR || — || align=right | 6.4 km || 
|-id=451 bgcolor=#fefefe
| 56451 ||  || — || April 6, 2000 || Socorro || LINEAR || — || align=right | 6.0 km || 
|-id=452 bgcolor=#fefefe
| 56452 ||  || — || April 4, 2000 || Socorro || LINEAR || — || align=right | 5.3 km || 
|-id=453 bgcolor=#fefefe
| 56453 ||  || — || April 4, 2000 || Socorro || LINEAR || V || align=right | 1.7 km || 
|-id=454 bgcolor=#fefefe
| 56454 ||  || — || April 4, 2000 || Socorro || LINEAR || — || align=right | 2.1 km || 
|-id=455 bgcolor=#fefefe
| 56455 ||  || — || April 4, 2000 || Socorro || LINEAR || FLO || align=right | 2.2 km || 
|-id=456 bgcolor=#fefefe
| 56456 ||  || — || April 4, 2000 || Socorro || LINEAR || — || align=right | 3.1 km || 
|-id=457 bgcolor=#fefefe
| 56457 ||  || — || April 6, 2000 || Socorro || LINEAR || FLO || align=right | 2.0 km || 
|-id=458 bgcolor=#fefefe
| 56458 ||  || — || April 6, 2000 || Socorro || LINEAR || — || align=right | 2.1 km || 
|-id=459 bgcolor=#fefefe
| 56459 ||  || — || April 6, 2000 || Socorro || LINEAR || FLO || align=right | 2.0 km || 
|-id=460 bgcolor=#fefefe
| 56460 ||  || — || April 6, 2000 || Socorro || LINEAR || — || align=right | 2.5 km || 
|-id=461 bgcolor=#fefefe
| 56461 ||  || — || April 6, 2000 || Socorro || LINEAR || — || align=right | 3.5 km || 
|-id=462 bgcolor=#fefefe
| 56462 ||  || — || April 7, 2000 || Socorro || LINEAR || NYS || align=right | 2.2 km || 
|-id=463 bgcolor=#fefefe
| 56463 ||  || — || April 7, 2000 || Socorro || LINEAR || V || align=right | 2.3 km || 
|-id=464 bgcolor=#fefefe
| 56464 ||  || — || April 7, 2000 || Socorro || LINEAR || — || align=right | 2.0 km || 
|-id=465 bgcolor=#fefefe
| 56465 ||  || — || April 7, 2000 || Socorro || LINEAR || FLO || align=right | 1.6 km || 
|-id=466 bgcolor=#fefefe
| 56466 ||  || — || April 7, 2000 || Socorro || LINEAR || — || align=right | 1.9 km || 
|-id=467 bgcolor=#fefefe
| 56467 ||  || — || April 7, 2000 || Socorro || LINEAR || FLO || align=right | 1.5 km || 
|-id=468 bgcolor=#fefefe
| 56468 ||  || — || April 7, 2000 || Socorro || LINEAR || NYS || align=right | 2.5 km || 
|-id=469 bgcolor=#fefefe
| 56469 ||  || — || April 7, 2000 || Socorro || LINEAR || NYS || align=right | 1.6 km || 
|-id=470 bgcolor=#fefefe
| 56470 ||  || — || April 7, 2000 || Socorro || LINEAR || — || align=right | 1.9 km || 
|-id=471 bgcolor=#fefefe
| 56471 ||  || — || April 7, 2000 || Socorro || LINEAR || — || align=right | 3.8 km || 
|-id=472 bgcolor=#fefefe
| 56472 ||  || — || April 7, 2000 || Socorro || LINEAR || FLO || align=right | 1.6 km || 
|-id=473 bgcolor=#fefefe
| 56473 ||  || — || April 7, 2000 || Socorro || LINEAR || — || align=right | 2.0 km || 
|-id=474 bgcolor=#fefefe
| 56474 ||  || — || April 7, 2000 || Socorro || LINEAR || — || align=right | 1.8 km || 
|-id=475 bgcolor=#fefefe
| 56475 ||  || — || April 7, 2000 || Socorro || LINEAR || — || align=right | 1.3 km || 
|-id=476 bgcolor=#fefefe
| 56476 ||  || — || April 2, 2000 || Anderson Mesa || LONEOS || FLO || align=right | 2.4 km || 
|-id=477 bgcolor=#fefefe
| 56477 ||  || — || April 3, 2000 || Anderson Mesa || LONEOS || — || align=right | 2.1 km || 
|-id=478 bgcolor=#fefefe
| 56478 ||  || — || April 3, 2000 || Anderson Mesa || LONEOS || FLO || align=right | 1.8 km || 
|-id=479 bgcolor=#E9E9E9
| 56479 ||  || — || April 7, 2000 || Socorro || LINEAR || — || align=right | 6.5 km || 
|-id=480 bgcolor=#fefefe
| 56480 ||  || — || April 7, 2000 || Socorro || LINEAR || FLO || align=right | 1.5 km || 
|-id=481 bgcolor=#fefefe
| 56481 ||  || — || April 7, 2000 || Socorro || LINEAR || FLO || align=right | 2.8 km || 
|-id=482 bgcolor=#fefefe
| 56482 ||  || — || April 8, 2000 || Socorro || LINEAR || — || align=right | 2.3 km || 
|-id=483 bgcolor=#fefefe
| 56483 ||  || — || April 6, 2000 || Kitt Peak || Spacewatch || V || align=right | 1.3 km || 
|-id=484 bgcolor=#fefefe
| 56484 ||  || — || April 7, 2000 || Socorro || LINEAR || V || align=right | 2.8 km || 
|-id=485 bgcolor=#E9E9E9
| 56485 ||  || — || April 7, 2000 || Socorro || LINEAR || — || align=right | 7.8 km || 
|-id=486 bgcolor=#fefefe
| 56486 ||  || — || April 7, 2000 || Socorro || LINEAR || V || align=right | 2.7 km || 
|-id=487 bgcolor=#fefefe
| 56487 ||  || — || April 7, 2000 || Socorro || LINEAR || — || align=right | 2.7 km || 
|-id=488 bgcolor=#fefefe
| 56488 ||  || — || April 7, 2000 || Kitt Peak || Spacewatch || V || align=right | 2.0 km || 
|-id=489 bgcolor=#fefefe
| 56489 ||  || — || April 7, 2000 || Kitt Peak || Spacewatch || — || align=right | 2.7 km || 
|-id=490 bgcolor=#fefefe
| 56490 ||  || — || April 12, 2000 || Haleakala || NEAT || — || align=right | 5.5 km || 
|-id=491 bgcolor=#fefefe
| 56491 ||  || — || April 7, 2000 || Socorro || LINEAR || — || align=right | 1.9 km || 
|-id=492 bgcolor=#fefefe
| 56492 ||  || — || April 7, 2000 || Socorro || LINEAR || — || align=right | 2.5 km || 
|-id=493 bgcolor=#fefefe
| 56493 ||  || — || April 8, 2000 || Socorro || LINEAR || FLO || align=right | 2.6 km || 
|-id=494 bgcolor=#fefefe
| 56494 ||  || — || April 12, 2000 || Socorro || LINEAR || V || align=right | 2.0 km || 
|-id=495 bgcolor=#fefefe
| 56495 ||  || — || April 4, 2000 || Anderson Mesa || LONEOS || — || align=right | 2.3 km || 
|-id=496 bgcolor=#fefefe
| 56496 ||  || — || April 4, 2000 || Anderson Mesa || LONEOS || FLO || align=right | 2.1 km || 
|-id=497 bgcolor=#fefefe
| 56497 ||  || — || April 4, 2000 || Anderson Mesa || LONEOS || — || align=right | 2.4 km || 
|-id=498 bgcolor=#fefefe
| 56498 ||  || — || April 4, 2000 || Anderson Mesa || LONEOS || — || align=right | 1.9 km || 
|-id=499 bgcolor=#fefefe
| 56499 ||  || — || April 7, 2000 || Anderson Mesa || LONEOS || — || align=right | 2.1 km || 
|-id=500 bgcolor=#fefefe
| 56500 ||  || — || April 7, 2000 || Anderson Mesa || LONEOS || — || align=right | 3.0 km || 
|}

56501–56600 

|-bgcolor=#fefefe
| 56501 ||  || — || April 6, 2000 || Anderson Mesa || LONEOS || — || align=right | 2.0 km || 
|-id=502 bgcolor=#E9E9E9
| 56502 ||  || — || April 7, 2000 || Socorro || LINEAR || — || align=right | 2.8 km || 
|-id=503 bgcolor=#fefefe
| 56503 ||  || — || April 7, 2000 || Socorro || LINEAR || V || align=right | 2.8 km || 
|-id=504 bgcolor=#fefefe
| 56504 ||  || — || April 5, 2000 || Socorro || LINEAR || V || align=right | 1.6 km || 
|-id=505 bgcolor=#fefefe
| 56505 ||  || — || April 2, 2000 || Anderson Mesa || LONEOS || — || align=right | 1.5 km || 
|-id=506 bgcolor=#fefefe
| 56506 ||  || — || April 5, 2000 || Anderson Mesa || LONEOS || V || align=right | 1.9 km || 
|-id=507 bgcolor=#fefefe
| 56507 ||  || — || April 4, 2000 || Anderson Mesa || LONEOS || V || align=right | 1.9 km || 
|-id=508 bgcolor=#fefefe
| 56508 ||  || — || April 24, 2000 || Kitt Peak || Spacewatch || — || align=right | 2.2 km || 
|-id=509 bgcolor=#fefefe
| 56509 ||  || — || April 24, 2000 || Kitt Peak || Spacewatch || V || align=right | 1.8 km || 
|-id=510 bgcolor=#fefefe
| 56510 ||  || — || April 27, 2000 || Socorro || LINEAR || — || align=right | 2.4 km || 
|-id=511 bgcolor=#fefefe
| 56511 ||  || — || April 27, 2000 || Socorro || LINEAR || NYS || align=right | 2.1 km || 
|-id=512 bgcolor=#fefefe
| 56512 ||  || — || April 27, 2000 || Socorro || LINEAR || — || align=right | 2.1 km || 
|-id=513 bgcolor=#E9E9E9
| 56513 ||  || — || April 28, 2000 || Socorro || LINEAR || — || align=right | 3.0 km || 
|-id=514 bgcolor=#E9E9E9
| 56514 ||  || — || April 25, 2000 || Kitt Peak || Spacewatch || — || align=right | 3.0 km || 
|-id=515 bgcolor=#fefefe
| 56515 ||  || — || April 27, 2000 || Kitt Peak || Spacewatch || V || align=right | 1.7 km || 
|-id=516 bgcolor=#fefefe
| 56516 ||  || — || April 27, 2000 || Kitt Peak || Spacewatch || V || align=right | 1.9 km || 
|-id=517 bgcolor=#fefefe
| 56517 ||  || — || April 27, 2000 || Socorro || LINEAR || FLO || align=right | 1.5 km || 
|-id=518 bgcolor=#E9E9E9
| 56518 ||  || — || April 27, 2000 || Socorro || LINEAR || — || align=right | 7.5 km || 
|-id=519 bgcolor=#fefefe
| 56519 ||  || — || April 27, 2000 || Socorro || LINEAR || — || align=right | 2.0 km || 
|-id=520 bgcolor=#fefefe
| 56520 ||  || — || April 28, 2000 || Socorro || LINEAR || FLO || align=right | 1.6 km || 
|-id=521 bgcolor=#fefefe
| 56521 ||  || — || April 29, 2000 || Socorro || LINEAR || — || align=right | 1.4 km || 
|-id=522 bgcolor=#fefefe
| 56522 ||  || — || April 24, 2000 || Anderson Mesa || LONEOS || — || align=right | 2.5 km || 
|-id=523 bgcolor=#fefefe
| 56523 ||  || — || April 24, 2000 || Anderson Mesa || LONEOS || — || align=right | 2.3 km || 
|-id=524 bgcolor=#fefefe
| 56524 ||  || — || April 28, 2000 || Socorro || LINEAR || — || align=right | 3.4 km || 
|-id=525 bgcolor=#fefefe
| 56525 ||  || — || April 29, 2000 || Socorro || LINEAR || — || align=right | 3.6 km || 
|-id=526 bgcolor=#fefefe
| 56526 ||  || — || April 27, 2000 || Socorro || LINEAR || V || align=right | 1.9 km || 
|-id=527 bgcolor=#fefefe
| 56527 ||  || — || April 28, 2000 || Socorro || LINEAR || — || align=right | 2.7 km || 
|-id=528 bgcolor=#fefefe
| 56528 ||  || — || April 26, 2000 || Anderson Mesa || LONEOS || — || align=right | 3.1 km || 
|-id=529 bgcolor=#fefefe
| 56529 ||  || — || April 26, 2000 || Anderson Mesa || LONEOS || — || align=right | 2.0 km || 
|-id=530 bgcolor=#fefefe
| 56530 ||  || — || April 26, 2000 || Anderson Mesa || LONEOS || FLO || align=right | 2.1 km || 
|-id=531 bgcolor=#fefefe
| 56531 ||  || — || April 29, 2000 || Socorro || LINEAR || V || align=right | 1.8 km || 
|-id=532 bgcolor=#fefefe
| 56532 ||  || — || April 29, 2000 || Socorro || LINEAR || — || align=right | 2.0 km || 
|-id=533 bgcolor=#fefefe
| 56533 ||  || — || April 29, 2000 || Socorro || LINEAR || FLO || align=right | 1.4 km || 
|-id=534 bgcolor=#fefefe
| 56534 ||  || — || April 29, 2000 || Socorro || LINEAR || ERI || align=right | 4.9 km || 
|-id=535 bgcolor=#fefefe
| 56535 ||  || — || April 29, 2000 || Socorro || LINEAR || — || align=right | 2.2 km || 
|-id=536 bgcolor=#fefefe
| 56536 ||  || — || April 29, 2000 || Socorro || LINEAR || V || align=right | 2.3 km || 
|-id=537 bgcolor=#E9E9E9
| 56537 ||  || — || April 29, 2000 || Socorro || LINEAR || — || align=right | 3.5 km || 
|-id=538 bgcolor=#fefefe
| 56538 ||  || — || April 29, 2000 || Socorro || LINEAR || — || align=right | 3.0 km || 
|-id=539 bgcolor=#fefefe
| 56539 ||  || — || April 25, 2000 || Anderson Mesa || LONEOS || FLO || align=right | 2.0 km || 
|-id=540 bgcolor=#fefefe
| 56540 ||  || — || April 25, 2000 || Anderson Mesa || LONEOS || — || align=right | 1.6 km || 
|-id=541 bgcolor=#fefefe
| 56541 ||  || — || April 25, 2000 || Anderson Mesa || LONEOS || — || align=right | 1.8 km || 
|-id=542 bgcolor=#fefefe
| 56542 ||  || — || April 26, 2000 || Anderson Mesa || LONEOS || MAS || align=right | 2.2 km || 
|-id=543 bgcolor=#fefefe
| 56543 ||  || — || April 26, 2000 || Anderson Mesa || LONEOS || V || align=right | 2.0 km || 
|-id=544 bgcolor=#fefefe
| 56544 ||  || — || April 26, 2000 || Anderson Mesa || LONEOS || V || align=right | 1.6 km || 
|-id=545 bgcolor=#fefefe
| 56545 ||  || — || April 26, 2000 || Kitt Peak || Spacewatch || NYS || align=right | 2.3 km || 
|-id=546 bgcolor=#fefefe
| 56546 ||  || — || April 26, 2000 || Anderson Mesa || LONEOS || FLO || align=right | 1.6 km || 
|-id=547 bgcolor=#fefefe
| 56547 ||  || — || April 26, 2000 || Anderson Mesa || LONEOS || — || align=right | 1.6 km || 
|-id=548 bgcolor=#fefefe
| 56548 ||  || — || April 27, 2000 || Socorro || LINEAR || — || align=right | 4.1 km || 
|-id=549 bgcolor=#fefefe
| 56549 ||  || — || April 27, 2000 || Socorro || LINEAR || FLO || align=right | 1.3 km || 
|-id=550 bgcolor=#fefefe
| 56550 ||  || — || April 28, 2000 || Socorro || LINEAR || FLO || align=right | 2.4 km || 
|-id=551 bgcolor=#fefefe
| 56551 ||  || — || April 28, 2000 || Socorro || LINEAR || — || align=right | 1.6 km || 
|-id=552 bgcolor=#fefefe
| 56552 ||  || — || April 28, 2000 || Socorro || LINEAR || V || align=right | 1.9 km || 
|-id=553 bgcolor=#fefefe
| 56553 ||  || — || April 28, 2000 || Socorro || LINEAR || — || align=right | 1.6 km || 
|-id=554 bgcolor=#fefefe
| 56554 ||  || — || April 29, 2000 || Kitt Peak || Spacewatch || V || align=right | 1.6 km || 
|-id=555 bgcolor=#fefefe
| 56555 ||  || — || April 30, 2000 || Anderson Mesa || LONEOS || — || align=right | 1.7 km || 
|-id=556 bgcolor=#fefefe
| 56556 ||  || — || April 27, 2000 || Socorro || LINEAR || — || align=right | 1.8 km || 
|-id=557 bgcolor=#fefefe
| 56557 ||  || — || April 30, 2000 || Haleakala || NEAT || V || align=right | 1.9 km || 
|-id=558 bgcolor=#d6d6d6
| 56558 ||  || — || April 24, 2000 || Anderson Mesa || LONEOS || KOR || align=right | 3.4 km || 
|-id=559 bgcolor=#fefefe
| 56559 ||  || — || May 4, 2000 || Socorro || LINEAR || — || align=right | 2.0 km || 
|-id=560 bgcolor=#fefefe
| 56560 ||  || — || May 4, 2000 || Socorro || LINEAR || — || align=right | 2.4 km || 
|-id=561 bgcolor=#fefefe
| 56561 Jaimenomen ||  ||  || May 5, 2000 || Starkenburg Observatory || Starkenburg Obs. || V || align=right | 2.3 km || 
|-id=562 bgcolor=#E9E9E9
| 56562 ||  || — || May 1, 2000 || Kitt Peak || Spacewatch || — || align=right | 4.5 km || 
|-id=563 bgcolor=#fefefe
| 56563 ||  || — || May 6, 2000 || Reedy Creek || J. Broughton || FLO || align=right | 2.2 km || 
|-id=564 bgcolor=#fefefe
| 56564 ||  || — || May 3, 2000 || Socorro || LINEAR || — || align=right | 2.1 km || 
|-id=565 bgcolor=#E9E9E9
| 56565 ||  || — || May 9, 2000 || Socorro || LINEAR || — || align=right | 4.5 km || 
|-id=566 bgcolor=#fefefe
| 56566 ||  || — || May 6, 2000 || Socorro || LINEAR || — || align=right | 2.3 km || 
|-id=567 bgcolor=#fefefe
| 56567 ||  || — || May 6, 2000 || Socorro || LINEAR || — || align=right | 3.7 km || 
|-id=568 bgcolor=#fefefe
| 56568 ||  || — || May 9, 2000 || Prescott || P. G. Comba || — || align=right | 1.9 km || 
|-id=569 bgcolor=#fefefe
| 56569 ||  || — || May 5, 2000 || Socorro || LINEAR || — || align=right | 2.6 km || 
|-id=570 bgcolor=#fefefe
| 56570 ||  || — || May 6, 2000 || Socorro || LINEAR || — || align=right | 2.4 km || 
|-id=571 bgcolor=#fefefe
| 56571 ||  || — || May 6, 2000 || Socorro || LINEAR || — || align=right | 2.9 km || 
|-id=572 bgcolor=#E9E9E9
| 56572 ||  || — || May 7, 2000 || Socorro || LINEAR || — || align=right | 4.2 km || 
|-id=573 bgcolor=#fefefe
| 56573 ||  || — || May 7, 2000 || Socorro || LINEAR || — || align=right | 2.5 km || 
|-id=574 bgcolor=#fefefe
| 56574 ||  || — || May 7, 2000 || Socorro || LINEAR || CHL || align=right | 5.7 km || 
|-id=575 bgcolor=#fefefe
| 56575 ||  || — || May 7, 2000 || Socorro || LINEAR || FLO || align=right | 1.7 km || 
|-id=576 bgcolor=#fefefe
| 56576 ||  || — || May 7, 2000 || Socorro || LINEAR || — || align=right | 2.5 km || 
|-id=577 bgcolor=#fefefe
| 56577 ||  || — || May 7, 2000 || Socorro || LINEAR || V || align=right | 1.6 km || 
|-id=578 bgcolor=#fefefe
| 56578 ||  || — || May 7, 2000 || Socorro || LINEAR || — || align=right | 2.7 km || 
|-id=579 bgcolor=#fefefe
| 56579 ||  || — || May 7, 2000 || Socorro || LINEAR || — || align=right | 2.5 km || 
|-id=580 bgcolor=#fefefe
| 56580 ||  || — || May 7, 2000 || Socorro || LINEAR || V || align=right | 2.3 km || 
|-id=581 bgcolor=#fefefe
| 56581 ||  || — || May 7, 2000 || Socorro || LINEAR || — || align=right | 1.6 km || 
|-id=582 bgcolor=#fefefe
| 56582 ||  || — || May 7, 2000 || Socorro || LINEAR || FLO || align=right | 1.7 km || 
|-id=583 bgcolor=#E9E9E9
| 56583 ||  || — || May 7, 2000 || Socorro || LINEAR || — || align=right | 3.1 km || 
|-id=584 bgcolor=#fefefe
| 56584 ||  || — || May 7, 2000 || Socorro || LINEAR || V || align=right | 1.6 km || 
|-id=585 bgcolor=#fefefe
| 56585 ||  || — || May 7, 2000 || Socorro || LINEAR || — || align=right | 2.9 km || 
|-id=586 bgcolor=#fefefe
| 56586 ||  || — || May 7, 2000 || Socorro || LINEAR || NYS || align=right | 2.4 km || 
|-id=587 bgcolor=#fefefe
| 56587 ||  || — || May 7, 2000 || Socorro || LINEAR || — || align=right | 3.3 km || 
|-id=588 bgcolor=#fefefe
| 56588 ||  || — || May 7, 2000 || Socorro || LINEAR || FLO || align=right | 1.9 km || 
|-id=589 bgcolor=#E9E9E9
| 56589 ||  || — || May 7, 2000 || Socorro || LINEAR || — || align=right | 4.9 km || 
|-id=590 bgcolor=#fefefe
| 56590 ||  || — || May 7, 2000 || Socorro || LINEAR || — || align=right | 2.1 km || 
|-id=591 bgcolor=#fefefe
| 56591 ||  || — || May 7, 2000 || Socorro || LINEAR || — || align=right | 3.7 km || 
|-id=592 bgcolor=#E9E9E9
| 56592 ||  || — || May 7, 2000 || Socorro || LINEAR || — || align=right | 7.8 km || 
|-id=593 bgcolor=#d6d6d6
| 56593 ||  || — || May 7, 2000 || Socorro || LINEAR || BRA || align=right | 4.6 km || 
|-id=594 bgcolor=#fefefe
| 56594 ||  || — || May 11, 2000 || Reedy Creek || J. Broughton || — || align=right | 2.6 km || 
|-id=595 bgcolor=#fefefe
| 56595 ||  || — || May 6, 2000 || Socorro || LINEAR || MAS || align=right | 2.1 km || 
|-id=596 bgcolor=#fefefe
| 56596 ||  || — || May 7, 2000 || Socorro || LINEAR || — || align=right | 2.0 km || 
|-id=597 bgcolor=#fefefe
| 56597 ||  || — || May 7, 2000 || Socorro || LINEAR || V || align=right | 1.4 km || 
|-id=598 bgcolor=#fefefe
| 56598 ||  || — || May 9, 2000 || Socorro || LINEAR || — || align=right | 2.3 km || 
|-id=599 bgcolor=#fefefe
| 56599 ||  || — || May 9, 2000 || Socorro || LINEAR || V || align=right | 1.9 km || 
|-id=600 bgcolor=#fefefe
| 56600 ||  || — || May 9, 2000 || Socorro || LINEAR || KLI || align=right | 5.5 km || 
|}

56601–56700 

|-bgcolor=#fefefe
| 56601 ||  || — || May 9, 2000 || Socorro || LINEAR || NYS || align=right | 2.0 km || 
|-id=602 bgcolor=#fefefe
| 56602 ||  || — || May 9, 2000 || Socorro || LINEAR || — || align=right | 1.9 km || 
|-id=603 bgcolor=#fefefe
| 56603 ||  || — || May 9, 2000 || Socorro || LINEAR || V || align=right | 2.1 km || 
|-id=604 bgcolor=#fefefe
| 56604 ||  || — || May 6, 2000 || Socorro || LINEAR || V || align=right | 2.0 km || 
|-id=605 bgcolor=#E9E9E9
| 56605 ||  || — || May 6, 2000 || Socorro || LINEAR || — || align=right | 4.4 km || 
|-id=606 bgcolor=#fefefe
| 56606 ||  || — || May 6, 2000 || Socorro || LINEAR || FLO || align=right | 3.2 km || 
|-id=607 bgcolor=#fefefe
| 56607 ||  || — || May 6, 2000 || Socorro || LINEAR || — || align=right | 2.8 km || 
|-id=608 bgcolor=#E9E9E9
| 56608 ||  || — || May 6, 2000 || Socorro || LINEAR || — || align=right | 5.2 km || 
|-id=609 bgcolor=#fefefe
| 56609 ||  || — || May 7, 2000 || Socorro || LINEAR || V || align=right | 2.1 km || 
|-id=610 bgcolor=#fefefe
| 56610 ||  || — || May 7, 2000 || Socorro || LINEAR || — || align=right | 3.2 km || 
|-id=611 bgcolor=#fefefe
| 56611 ||  || — || May 7, 2000 || Socorro || LINEAR || FLO || align=right | 3.2 km || 
|-id=612 bgcolor=#fefefe
| 56612 ||  || — || May 7, 2000 || Socorro || LINEAR || — || align=right | 3.2 km || 
|-id=613 bgcolor=#E9E9E9
| 56613 ||  || — || May 9, 2000 || Socorro || LINEAR || — || align=right | 4.2 km || 
|-id=614 bgcolor=#fefefe
| 56614 ||  || — || May 9, 2000 || Socorro || LINEAR || — || align=right | 3.2 km || 
|-id=615 bgcolor=#E9E9E9
| 56615 ||  || — || May 1, 2000 || Anderson Mesa || LONEOS || HNS || align=right | 2.8 km || 
|-id=616 bgcolor=#fefefe
| 56616 ||  || — || May 1, 2000 || Anderson Mesa || LONEOS || — || align=right | 4.1 km || 
|-id=617 bgcolor=#fefefe
| 56617 ||  || — || May 2, 2000 || Anderson Mesa || LONEOS || V || align=right | 2.0 km || 
|-id=618 bgcolor=#E9E9E9
| 56618 ||  || — || May 2, 2000 || Anderson Mesa || LONEOS || MAR || align=right | 2.8 km || 
|-id=619 bgcolor=#fefefe
| 56619 ||  || — || May 2, 2000 || Anderson Mesa || LONEOS || V || align=right | 1.7 km || 
|-id=620 bgcolor=#fefefe
| 56620 ||  || — || May 2, 2000 || Haleakala || NEAT || — || align=right | 2.1 km || 
|-id=621 bgcolor=#fefefe
| 56621 ||  || — || May 3, 2000 || Kitt Peak || Spacewatch || — || align=right | 1.5 km || 
|-id=622 bgcolor=#fefefe
| 56622 ||  || — || May 5, 2000 || Socorro || LINEAR || FLO || align=right | 2.0 km || 
|-id=623 bgcolor=#fefefe
| 56623 ||  || — || May 6, 2000 || Socorro || LINEAR || — || align=right | 1.4 km || 
|-id=624 bgcolor=#fefefe
| 56624 ||  || — || May 7, 2000 || Socorro || LINEAR || FLO || align=right | 1.2 km || 
|-id=625 bgcolor=#fefefe
| 56625 ||  || — || May 9, 2000 || Socorro || LINEAR || — || align=right | 2.4 km || 
|-id=626 bgcolor=#fefefe
| 56626 ||  || — || May 9, 2000 || Socorro || LINEAR || FLO || align=right | 5.7 km || 
|-id=627 bgcolor=#fefefe
| 56627 ||  || — || May 5, 2000 || Socorro || LINEAR || — || align=right | 3.1 km || 
|-id=628 bgcolor=#fefefe
| 56628 ||  || — || May 5, 2000 || Socorro || LINEAR || — || align=right | 1.5 km || 
|-id=629 bgcolor=#fefefe
| 56629 || 2000 KV || — || May 25, 2000 || Prescott || P. G. Comba || MAS || align=right | 1.9 km || 
|-id=630 bgcolor=#E9E9E9
| 56630 ||  || — || May 26, 2000 || Socorro || LINEAR || BRU || align=right | 11 km || 
|-id=631 bgcolor=#E9E9E9
| 56631 ||  || — || May 26, 2000 || Socorro || LINEAR || — || align=right | 9.4 km || 
|-id=632 bgcolor=#fefefe
| 56632 ||  || — || May 27, 2000 || Socorro || LINEAR || NYS || align=right | 3.5 km || 
|-id=633 bgcolor=#fefefe
| 56633 ||  || — || May 28, 2000 || Socorro || LINEAR || — || align=right | 1.4 km || 
|-id=634 bgcolor=#E9E9E9
| 56634 ||  || — || May 28, 2000 || Socorro || LINEAR || — || align=right | 2.9 km || 
|-id=635 bgcolor=#fefefe
| 56635 ||  || — || May 28, 2000 || Socorro || LINEAR || MAS || align=right | 2.2 km || 
|-id=636 bgcolor=#E9E9E9
| 56636 ||  || — || May 28, 2000 || Socorro || LINEAR || EUN || align=right | 2.7 km || 
|-id=637 bgcolor=#d6d6d6
| 56637 ||  || — || May 28, 2000 || Socorro || LINEAR || CHA || align=right | 4.9 km || 
|-id=638 bgcolor=#fefefe
| 56638 ||  || — || May 28, 2000 || Socorro || LINEAR || NYS || align=right | 1.9 km || 
|-id=639 bgcolor=#fefefe
| 56639 ||  || — || May 28, 2000 || Socorro || LINEAR || V || align=right | 1.9 km || 
|-id=640 bgcolor=#E9E9E9
| 56640 ||  || — || May 28, 2000 || Socorro || LINEAR || — || align=right | 2.4 km || 
|-id=641 bgcolor=#fefefe
| 56641 ||  || — || May 28, 2000 || Socorro || LINEAR || — || align=right | 2.4 km || 
|-id=642 bgcolor=#fefefe
| 56642 ||  || — || May 28, 2000 || Socorro || LINEAR || V || align=right | 1.8 km || 
|-id=643 bgcolor=#fefefe
| 56643 ||  || — || May 28, 2000 || Socorro || LINEAR || V || align=right | 1.9 km || 
|-id=644 bgcolor=#fefefe
| 56644 ||  || — || May 28, 2000 || Socorro || LINEAR || V || align=right | 2.7 km || 
|-id=645 bgcolor=#fefefe
| 56645 ||  || — || May 28, 2000 || Socorro || LINEAR || V || align=right | 3.0 km || 
|-id=646 bgcolor=#fefefe
| 56646 ||  || — || May 28, 2000 || Socorro || LINEAR || V || align=right | 2.0 km || 
|-id=647 bgcolor=#fefefe
| 56647 ||  || — || May 27, 2000 || Socorro || LINEAR || V || align=right | 1.7 km || 
|-id=648 bgcolor=#E9E9E9
| 56648 ||  || — || May 27, 2000 || Socorro || LINEAR || — || align=right | 4.1 km || 
|-id=649 bgcolor=#fefefe
| 56649 ||  || — || May 27, 2000 || Socorro || LINEAR || — || align=right | 2.5 km || 
|-id=650 bgcolor=#fefefe
| 56650 ||  || — || May 28, 2000 || Socorro || LINEAR || LCI || align=right | 3.6 km || 
|-id=651 bgcolor=#fefefe
| 56651 ||  || — || May 27, 2000 || Socorro || LINEAR || FLO || align=right | 1.8 km || 
|-id=652 bgcolor=#fefefe
| 56652 ||  || — || May 27, 2000 || Socorro || LINEAR || FLO || align=right | 2.4 km || 
|-id=653 bgcolor=#fefefe
| 56653 ||  || — || May 29, 2000 || Socorro || LINEAR || V || align=right | 1.5 km || 
|-id=654 bgcolor=#fefefe
| 56654 ||  || — || May 28, 2000 || Socorro || LINEAR || V || align=right | 2.5 km || 
|-id=655 bgcolor=#fefefe
| 56655 ||  || — || May 23, 2000 || Anderson Mesa || LONEOS || FLO || align=right | 1.7 km || 
|-id=656 bgcolor=#fefefe
| 56656 ||  || — || May 25, 2000 || Anderson Mesa || LONEOS || FLO || align=right | 1.8 km || 
|-id=657 bgcolor=#fefefe
| 56657 ||  || — || May 25, 2000 || Anderson Mesa || LONEOS || FLO || align=right | 3.4 km || 
|-id=658 bgcolor=#fefefe
| 56658 ||  || — || May 27, 2000 || Socorro || LINEAR || FLO || align=right | 1.7 km || 
|-id=659 bgcolor=#fefefe
| 56659 ||  || — || May 27, 2000 || Socorro || LINEAR || — || align=right | 1.5 km || 
|-id=660 bgcolor=#fefefe
| 56660 ||  || — || May 27, 2000 || Socorro || LINEAR || — || align=right | 2.7 km || 
|-id=661 bgcolor=#d6d6d6
| 56661 ||  || — || May 27, 2000 || Socorro || LINEAR || — || align=right | 7.4 km || 
|-id=662 bgcolor=#E9E9E9
| 56662 ||  || — || May 27, 2000 || Socorro || LINEAR || — || align=right | 3.3 km || 
|-id=663 bgcolor=#fefefe
| 56663 ||  || — || May 25, 2000 || Anderson Mesa || LONEOS || V || align=right | 1.8 km || 
|-id=664 bgcolor=#fefefe
| 56664 ||  || — || May 25, 2000 || Anderson Mesa || LONEOS || V || align=right | 1.4 km || 
|-id=665 bgcolor=#E9E9E9
| 56665 ||  || — || May 26, 2000 || Anderson Mesa || LONEOS || BRU || align=right | 6.1 km || 
|-id=666 bgcolor=#fefefe
| 56666 ||  || — || May 27, 2000 || Socorro || LINEAR || — || align=right | 1.8 km || 
|-id=667 bgcolor=#fefefe
| 56667 ||  || — || May 31, 2000 || Socorro || LINEAR || PHO || align=right | 3.1 km || 
|-id=668 bgcolor=#fefefe
| 56668 ||  || — || May 29, 2000 || Kitt Peak || Spacewatch || V || align=right | 1.6 km || 
|-id=669 bgcolor=#d6d6d6
| 56669 ||  || — || May 28, 2000 || Socorro || LINEAR || — || align=right | 6.4 km || 
|-id=670 bgcolor=#fefefe
| 56670 ||  || — || May 27, 2000 || Socorro || LINEAR || — || align=right | 2.5 km || 
|-id=671 bgcolor=#fefefe
| 56671 ||  || — || May 27, 2000 || Socorro || LINEAR || V || align=right | 1.5 km || 
|-id=672 bgcolor=#fefefe
| 56672 ||  || — || May 27, 2000 || Socorro || LINEAR || V || align=right | 1.5 km || 
|-id=673 bgcolor=#fefefe
| 56673 ||  || — || May 27, 2000 || Socorro || LINEAR || — || align=right | 2.1 km || 
|-id=674 bgcolor=#fefefe
| 56674 ||  || — || May 27, 2000 || Socorro || LINEAR || — || align=right | 2.8 km || 
|-id=675 bgcolor=#fefefe
| 56675 ||  || — || May 27, 2000 || Socorro || LINEAR || — || align=right | 1.9 km || 
|-id=676 bgcolor=#fefefe
| 56676 || 2000 LC || — || June 1, 2000 || Prescott || P. G. Comba || NYS || align=right | 1.4 km || 
|-id=677 bgcolor=#fefefe
| 56677 ||  || — || June 1, 2000 || Črni Vrh || Črni Vrh || — || align=right | 3.1 km || 
|-id=678 bgcolor=#d6d6d6
| 56678 Alicewessen ||  ||  || June 3, 2000 || Farpoint || G. Hug || EOS || align=right | 6.6 km || 
|-id=679 bgcolor=#fefefe
| 56679 ||  || — || June 6, 2000 || Socorro || LINEAR || FLO || align=right | 2.1 km || 
|-id=680 bgcolor=#E9E9E9
| 56680 ||  || — || June 6, 2000 || Socorro || LINEAR || — || align=right | 4.8 km || 
|-id=681 bgcolor=#fefefe
| 56681 ||  || — || June 5, 2000 || Socorro || LINEAR || — || align=right | 1.7 km || 
|-id=682 bgcolor=#fefefe
| 56682 ||  || — || June 5, 2000 || Socorro || LINEAR || — || align=right | 2.6 km || 
|-id=683 bgcolor=#fefefe
| 56683 ||  || — || June 5, 2000 || Socorro || LINEAR || NYS || align=right | 1.9 km || 
|-id=684 bgcolor=#E9E9E9
| 56684 ||  || — || June 4, 2000 || Socorro || LINEAR || ADE || align=right | 5.0 km || 
|-id=685 bgcolor=#E9E9E9
| 56685 ||  || — || June 4, 2000 || Socorro || LINEAR || — || align=right | 4.1 km || 
|-id=686 bgcolor=#E9E9E9
| 56686 ||  || — || June 4, 2000 || Socorro || LINEAR || MAR || align=right | 3.7 km || 
|-id=687 bgcolor=#E9E9E9
| 56687 ||  || — || June 4, 2000 || Socorro || LINEAR || — || align=right | 5.0 km || 
|-id=688 bgcolor=#E9E9E9
| 56688 ||  || — || June 5, 2000 || Socorro || LINEAR || — || align=right | 5.3 km || 
|-id=689 bgcolor=#E9E9E9
| 56689 ||  || — || June 6, 2000 || Socorro || LINEAR || — || align=right | 6.1 km || 
|-id=690 bgcolor=#fefefe
| 56690 ||  || — || June 5, 2000 || Črni Vrh || Črni Vrh || — || align=right | 2.2 km || 
|-id=691 bgcolor=#E9E9E9
| 56691 ||  || — || June 4, 2000 || Socorro || LINEAR || MAR || align=right | 2.6 km || 
|-id=692 bgcolor=#E9E9E9
| 56692 ||  || — || June 8, 2000 || Socorro || LINEAR || — || align=right | 5.8 km || 
|-id=693 bgcolor=#E9E9E9
| 56693 ||  || — || June 8, 2000 || Socorro || LINEAR || — || align=right | 4.2 km || 
|-id=694 bgcolor=#E9E9E9
| 56694 ||  || — || June 1, 2000 || Socorro || LINEAR || — || align=right | 5.3 km || 
|-id=695 bgcolor=#E9E9E9
| 56695 ||  || — || June 1, 2000 || Socorro || LINEAR || — || align=right | 6.5 km || 
|-id=696 bgcolor=#fefefe
| 56696 ||  || — || June 1, 2000 || Anderson Mesa || LONEOS || V || align=right | 4.4 km || 
|-id=697 bgcolor=#E9E9E9
| 56697 ||  || — || June 6, 2000 || Anderson Mesa || LONEOS || — || align=right | 3.6 km || 
|-id=698 bgcolor=#E9E9E9
| 56698 ||  || — || June 6, 2000 || Anderson Mesa || LONEOS || — || align=right | 3.4 km || 
|-id=699 bgcolor=#E9E9E9
| 56699 ||  || — || June 6, 2000 || Anderson Mesa || LONEOS || — || align=right | 4.4 km || 
|-id=700 bgcolor=#E9E9E9
| 56700 ||  || — || June 6, 2000 || Anderson Mesa || LONEOS || MAR || align=right | 4.7 km || 
|}

56701–56800 

|-bgcolor=#E9E9E9
| 56701 ||  || — || June 9, 2000 || Anderson Mesa || LONEOS || — || align=right | 6.8 km || 
|-id=702 bgcolor=#d6d6d6
| 56702 ||  || — || June 9, 2000 || Anderson Mesa || LONEOS || — || align=right | 12 km || 
|-id=703 bgcolor=#E9E9E9
| 56703 ||  || — || June 10, 2000 || Socorro || LINEAR || — || align=right | 7.2 km || 
|-id=704 bgcolor=#fefefe
| 56704 ||  || — || June 6, 2000 || Anderson Mesa || LONEOS || — || align=right | 2.7 km || 
|-id=705 bgcolor=#E9E9E9
| 56705 ||  || — || June 4, 2000 || Kitt Peak || Spacewatch || — || align=right | 3.3 km || 
|-id=706 bgcolor=#fefefe
| 56706 ||  || — || June 1, 2000 || Haleakala || NEAT || — || align=right | 2.4 km || 
|-id=707 bgcolor=#E9E9E9
| 56707 ||  || — || June 11, 2000 || Socorro || LINEAR || MAR || align=right | 4.5 km || 
|-id=708 bgcolor=#fefefe
| 56708 || 2000 MZ || — || June 24, 2000 || Reedy Creek || J. Broughton || — || align=right | 2.6 km || 
|-id=709 bgcolor=#E9E9E9
| 56709 ||  || — || June 27, 2000 || Reedy Creek || J. Broughton || — || align=right | 6.4 km || 
|-id=710 bgcolor=#E9E9E9
| 56710 ||  || — || June 24, 2000 || Haleakala || NEAT || — || align=right | 3.0 km || 
|-id=711 bgcolor=#E9E9E9
| 56711 ||  || — || June 24, 2000 || Haleakala || NEAT || EUN || align=right | 4.6 km || 
|-id=712 bgcolor=#fefefe
| 56712 ||  || — || June 25, 2000 || Haleakala || NEAT || NYS || align=right | 1.5 km || 
|-id=713 bgcolor=#E9E9E9
| 56713 ||  || — || June 30, 2000 || Ondřejov || P. Kušnirák || — || align=right | 3.0 km || 
|-id=714 bgcolor=#d6d6d6
| 56714 ||  || — || June 25, 2000 || Kitt Peak || Spacewatch || — || align=right | 7.8 km || 
|-id=715 bgcolor=#fefefe
| 56715 ||  || — || June 24, 2000 || Socorro || LINEAR || — || align=right | 2.2 km || 
|-id=716 bgcolor=#fefefe
| 56716 ||  || — || June 24, 2000 || Socorro || LINEAR || — || align=right | 3.2 km || 
|-id=717 bgcolor=#E9E9E9
| 56717 ||  || — || June 25, 2000 || Socorro || LINEAR || EUN || align=right | 3.3 km || 
|-id=718 bgcolor=#E9E9E9
| 56718 ||  || — || June 25, 2000 || Socorro || LINEAR || — || align=right | 2.9 km || 
|-id=719 bgcolor=#fefefe
| 56719 ||  || — || June 24, 2000 || Socorro || LINEAR || — || align=right | 2.2 km || 
|-id=720 bgcolor=#d6d6d6
| 56720 ||  || — || July 7, 2000 || Socorro || LINEAR || — || align=right | 5.9 km || 
|-id=721 bgcolor=#fefefe
| 56721 ||  || — || July 4, 2000 || Anderson Mesa || LONEOS || — || align=right | 2.4 km || 
|-id=722 bgcolor=#E9E9E9
| 56722 ||  || — || July 5, 2000 || Anderson Mesa || LONEOS || MAR || align=right | 4.2 km || 
|-id=723 bgcolor=#E9E9E9
| 56723 ||  || — || July 5, 2000 || Anderson Mesa || LONEOS || MAR || align=right | 3.4 km || 
|-id=724 bgcolor=#fefefe
| 56724 ||  || — || July 5, 2000 || Anderson Mesa || LONEOS || — || align=right | 3.3 km || 
|-id=725 bgcolor=#E9E9E9
| 56725 ||  || — || July 5, 2000 || Anderson Mesa || LONEOS || — || align=right | 3.8 km || 
|-id=726 bgcolor=#d6d6d6
| 56726 ||  || — || July 5, 2000 || Anderson Mesa || LONEOS || EOS || align=right | 5.7 km || 
|-id=727 bgcolor=#d6d6d6
| 56727 ||  || — || July 5, 2000 || Anderson Mesa || LONEOS || — || align=right | 9.4 km || 
|-id=728 bgcolor=#d6d6d6
| 56728 ||  || — || July 5, 2000 || Anderson Mesa || LONEOS || EOS || align=right | 5.3 km || 
|-id=729 bgcolor=#d6d6d6
| 56729 ||  || — || July 5, 2000 || Anderson Mesa || LONEOS || — || align=right | 6.7 km || 
|-id=730 bgcolor=#d6d6d6
| 56730 ||  || — || July 5, 2000 || Anderson Mesa || LONEOS || NAE || align=right | 9.8 km || 
|-id=731 bgcolor=#E9E9E9
| 56731 ||  || — || July 5, 2000 || Anderson Mesa || LONEOS || MRX || align=right | 2.3 km || 
|-id=732 bgcolor=#E9E9E9
| 56732 ||  || — || July 5, 2000 || Anderson Mesa || LONEOS || — || align=right | 5.5 km || 
|-id=733 bgcolor=#d6d6d6
| 56733 ||  || — || July 5, 2000 || Anderson Mesa || LONEOS || HYG || align=right | 5.6 km || 
|-id=734 bgcolor=#d6d6d6
| 56734 ||  || — || July 5, 2000 || Anderson Mesa || LONEOS || — || align=right | 13 km || 
|-id=735 bgcolor=#E9E9E9
| 56735 ||  || — || July 5, 2000 || Anderson Mesa || LONEOS || — || align=right | 2.8 km || 
|-id=736 bgcolor=#E9E9E9
| 56736 ||  || — || July 5, 2000 || Anderson Mesa || LONEOS || — || align=right | 2.3 km || 
|-id=737 bgcolor=#E9E9E9
| 56737 ||  || — || July 6, 2000 || Anderson Mesa || LONEOS || — || align=right | 5.9 km || 
|-id=738 bgcolor=#E9E9E9
| 56738 ||  || — || July 6, 2000 || Anderson Mesa || LONEOS || — || align=right | 4.0 km || 
|-id=739 bgcolor=#E9E9E9
| 56739 ||  || — || July 7, 2000 || Anderson Mesa || LONEOS || EUN || align=right | 4.9 km || 
|-id=740 bgcolor=#E9E9E9
| 56740 ||  || — || July 5, 2000 || Anderson Mesa || LONEOS || BRU || align=right | 8.5 km || 
|-id=741 bgcolor=#d6d6d6
| 56741 ||  || — || July 5, 2000 || Kitt Peak || Spacewatch || — || align=right | 6.4 km || 
|-id=742 bgcolor=#d6d6d6
| 56742 ||  || — || July 4, 2000 || Anderson Mesa || LONEOS || — || align=right | 6.2 km || 
|-id=743 bgcolor=#E9E9E9
| 56743 ||  || — || July 4, 2000 || Anderson Mesa || LONEOS || — || align=right | 4.8 km || 
|-id=744 bgcolor=#d6d6d6
| 56744 ||  || — || July 4, 2000 || Anderson Mesa || LONEOS || EOS || align=right | 5.7 km || 
|-id=745 bgcolor=#d6d6d6
| 56745 ||  || — || July 4, 2000 || Anderson Mesa || LONEOS || EOS || align=right | 5.7 km || 
|-id=746 bgcolor=#E9E9E9
| 56746 ||  || — || July 27, 2000 || Črni Vrh || Črni Vrh || — || align=right | 4.5 km || 
|-id=747 bgcolor=#d6d6d6
| 56747 ||  || — || July 24, 2000 || Socorro || LINEAR || EOS || align=right | 6.4 km || 
|-id=748 bgcolor=#E9E9E9
| 56748 ||  || — || July 24, 2000 || Socorro || LINEAR || BRG || align=right | 3.9 km || 
|-id=749 bgcolor=#d6d6d6
| 56749 ||  || — || July 24, 2000 || Socorro || LINEAR || — || align=right | 5.6 km || 
|-id=750 bgcolor=#E9E9E9
| 56750 ||  || — || July 24, 2000 || Socorro || LINEAR || — || align=right | 5.2 km || 
|-id=751 bgcolor=#d6d6d6
| 56751 ||  || — || July 24, 2000 || Socorro || LINEAR || EOS || align=right | 7.5 km || 
|-id=752 bgcolor=#d6d6d6
| 56752 ||  || — || July 24, 2000 || Socorro || LINEAR || — || align=right | 12 km || 
|-id=753 bgcolor=#E9E9E9
| 56753 ||  || — || July 29, 2000 || Socorro || LINEAR || — || align=right | 3.4 km || 
|-id=754 bgcolor=#E9E9E9
| 56754 ||  || — || July 23, 2000 || Socorro || LINEAR || — || align=right | 2.3 km || 
|-id=755 bgcolor=#fefefe
| 56755 ||  || — || July 23, 2000 || Socorro || LINEAR || NYS || align=right | 1.7 km || 
|-id=756 bgcolor=#E9E9E9
| 56756 ||  || — || July 23, 2000 || Socorro || LINEAR || — || align=right | 6.4 km || 
|-id=757 bgcolor=#E9E9E9
| 56757 ||  || — || July 23, 2000 || Socorro || LINEAR || — || align=right | 3.0 km || 
|-id=758 bgcolor=#E9E9E9
| 56758 ||  || — || July 23, 2000 || Socorro || LINEAR || EUN || align=right | 2.8 km || 
|-id=759 bgcolor=#E9E9E9
| 56759 ||  || — || July 23, 2000 || Socorro || LINEAR || MIS || align=right | 7.4 km || 
|-id=760 bgcolor=#E9E9E9
| 56760 ||  || — || July 23, 2000 || Socorro || LINEAR || — || align=right | 5.1 km || 
|-id=761 bgcolor=#fefefe
| 56761 ||  || — || July 29, 2000 || Socorro || LINEAR || — || align=right | 3.0 km || 
|-id=762 bgcolor=#E9E9E9
| 56762 ||  || — || July 23, 2000 || Socorro || LINEAR || — || align=right | 3.1 km || 
|-id=763 bgcolor=#fefefe
| 56763 ||  || — || July 23, 2000 || Socorro || LINEAR || — || align=right | 3.1 km || 
|-id=764 bgcolor=#d6d6d6
| 56764 ||  || — || July 23, 2000 || Socorro || LINEAR || — || align=right | 11 km || 
|-id=765 bgcolor=#E9E9E9
| 56765 ||  || — || July 23, 2000 || Socorro || LINEAR || XIZ || align=right | 4.0 km || 
|-id=766 bgcolor=#E9E9E9
| 56766 ||  || — || July 23, 2000 || Socorro || LINEAR || — || align=right | 7.5 km || 
|-id=767 bgcolor=#E9E9E9
| 56767 ||  || — || July 23, 2000 || Socorro || LINEAR || — || align=right | 6.1 km || 
|-id=768 bgcolor=#d6d6d6
| 56768 ||  || — || July 23, 2000 || Socorro || LINEAR || MEL || align=right | 16 km || 
|-id=769 bgcolor=#E9E9E9
| 56769 ||  || — || July 24, 2000 || Socorro || LINEAR || EUN || align=right | 4.3 km || 
|-id=770 bgcolor=#fefefe
| 56770 ||  || — || July 30, 2000 || Socorro || LINEAR || — || align=right | 3.0 km || 
|-id=771 bgcolor=#E9E9E9
| 56771 ||  || — || July 30, 2000 || Socorro || LINEAR || — || align=right | 6.0 km || 
|-id=772 bgcolor=#d6d6d6
| 56772 ||  || — || July 30, 2000 || Socorro || LINEAR || — || align=right | 7.7 km || 
|-id=773 bgcolor=#d6d6d6
| 56773 ||  || — || July 31, 2000 || Socorro || LINEAR || EOS || align=right | 5.9 km || 
|-id=774 bgcolor=#d6d6d6
| 56774 ||  || — || July 30, 2000 || Socorro || LINEAR || EOS || align=right | 6.2 km || 
|-id=775 bgcolor=#E9E9E9
| 56775 ||  || — || July 30, 2000 || Socorro || LINEAR || EUN || align=right | 3.6 km || 
|-id=776 bgcolor=#E9E9E9
| 56776 ||  || — || July 30, 2000 || Socorro || LINEAR || EUN || align=right | 3.6 km || 
|-id=777 bgcolor=#E9E9E9
| 56777 ||  || — || July 30, 2000 || Socorro || LINEAR || — || align=right | 8.0 km || 
|-id=778 bgcolor=#E9E9E9
| 56778 ||  || — || July 30, 2000 || Socorro || LINEAR || — || align=right | 3.7 km || 
|-id=779 bgcolor=#E9E9E9
| 56779 ||  || — || July 30, 2000 || Socorro || LINEAR || EUN || align=right | 2.9 km || 
|-id=780 bgcolor=#E9E9E9
| 56780 ||  || — || July 30, 2000 || Socorro || LINEAR || — || align=right | 4.7 km || 
|-id=781 bgcolor=#d6d6d6
| 56781 ||  || — || July 30, 2000 || Socorro || LINEAR || — || align=right | 5.9 km || 
|-id=782 bgcolor=#E9E9E9
| 56782 ||  || — || July 30, 2000 || Socorro || LINEAR || — || align=right | 3.3 km || 
|-id=783 bgcolor=#E9E9E9
| 56783 ||  || — || July 30, 2000 || Socorro || LINEAR || — || align=right | 6.8 km || 
|-id=784 bgcolor=#d6d6d6
| 56784 ||  || — || July 30, 2000 || Socorro || LINEAR || — || align=right | 8.0 km || 
|-id=785 bgcolor=#E9E9E9
| 56785 ||  || — || July 30, 2000 || Socorro || LINEAR || — || align=right | 8.2 km || 
|-id=786 bgcolor=#E9E9E9
| 56786 ||  || — || July 29, 2000 || Anderson Mesa || LONEOS || — || align=right | 2.7 km || 
|-id=787 bgcolor=#d6d6d6
| 56787 ||  || — || July 29, 2000 || Anderson Mesa || LONEOS || EOS || align=right | 4.1 km || 
|-id=788 bgcolor=#d6d6d6
| 56788 Guilbertlepoutre ||  ||  || July 29, 2000 || Anderson Mesa || LONEOS || JLI || align=right | 11 km || 
|-id=789 bgcolor=#d6d6d6
| 56789 ||  || — || July 29, 2000 || Anderson Mesa || LONEOS || — || align=right | 6.9 km || 
|-id=790 bgcolor=#E9E9E9
| 56790 ||  || — || July 29, 2000 || Anderson Mesa || LONEOS || PAD || align=right | 4.9 km || 
|-id=791 bgcolor=#E9E9E9
| 56791 ||  || — || July 29, 2000 || Anderson Mesa || LONEOS || — || align=right | 3.4 km || 
|-id=792 bgcolor=#fefefe
| 56792 ||  || — || July 29, 2000 || Anderson Mesa || LONEOS || NYS || align=right | 1.9 km || 
|-id=793 bgcolor=#E9E9E9
| 56793 ||  || — || July 29, 2000 || Anderson Mesa || LONEOS || MAR || align=right | 2.6 km || 
|-id=794 bgcolor=#d6d6d6
| 56794 ||  || — || July 29, 2000 || Anderson Mesa || LONEOS || — || align=right | 7.9 km || 
|-id=795 bgcolor=#d6d6d6
| 56795 Amandagorman ||  ||  || July 31, 2000 || Cerro Tololo || M. W. Buie || — || align=right | 3.9 km || 
|-id=796 bgcolor=#E9E9E9
| 56796 || 2000 PT || — || August 1, 2000 || Socorro || LINEAR || — || align=right | 4.2 km || 
|-id=797 bgcolor=#fefefe
| 56797 ||  || — || August 1, 2000 || Socorro || LINEAR || — || align=right | 2.6 km || 
|-id=798 bgcolor=#E9E9E9
| 56798 ||  || — || August 3, 2000 || Bisei SG Center || BATTeRS || — || align=right | 3.0 km || 
|-id=799 bgcolor=#E9E9E9
| 56799 ||  || — || August 2, 2000 || Socorro || LINEAR || — || align=right | 3.6 km || 
|-id=800 bgcolor=#E9E9E9
| 56800 ||  || — || August 3, 2000 || Socorro || LINEAR || MAR || align=right | 3.2 km || 
|}

56801–56900 

|-bgcolor=#d6d6d6
| 56801 ||  || — || August 6, 2000 || Siding Spring || R. H. McNaught || ALA || align=right | 8.0 km || 
|-id=802 bgcolor=#E9E9E9
| 56802 ||  || — || August 1, 2000 || Socorro || LINEAR || — || align=right | 5.4 km || 
|-id=803 bgcolor=#fefefe
| 56803 ||  || — || August 1, 2000 || Socorro || LINEAR || — || align=right | 3.6 km || 
|-id=804 bgcolor=#d6d6d6
| 56804 ||  || — || August 3, 2000 || Socorro || LINEAR || EOS || align=right | 5.3 km || 
|-id=805 bgcolor=#d6d6d6
| 56805 ||  || — || August 3, 2000 || Socorro || LINEAR || — || align=right | 5.3 km || 
|-id=806 bgcolor=#E9E9E9
| 56806 ||  || — || August 1, 2000 || Socorro || LINEAR || — || align=right | 2.8 km || 
|-id=807 bgcolor=#E9E9E9
| 56807 ||  || — || August 1, 2000 || Socorro || LINEAR || — || align=right | 2.7 km || 
|-id=808 bgcolor=#d6d6d6
| 56808 ||  || — || August 1, 2000 || Socorro || LINEAR || KOR || align=right | 3.2 km || 
|-id=809 bgcolor=#d6d6d6
| 56809 ||  || — || August 1, 2000 || Socorro || LINEAR || — || align=right | 8.2 km || 
|-id=810 bgcolor=#d6d6d6
| 56810 ||  || — || August 1, 2000 || Socorro || LINEAR || — || align=right | 3.1 km || 
|-id=811 bgcolor=#d6d6d6
| 56811 ||  || — || August 1, 2000 || Socorro || LINEAR || EOS || align=right | 6.0 km || 
|-id=812 bgcolor=#E9E9E9
| 56812 ||  || — || August 1, 2000 || Socorro || LINEAR || — || align=right | 4.1 km || 
|-id=813 bgcolor=#E9E9E9
| 56813 ||  || — || August 1, 2000 || Socorro || LINEAR || — || align=right | 4.8 km || 
|-id=814 bgcolor=#E9E9E9
| 56814 ||  || — || August 1, 2000 || Socorro || LINEAR || — || align=right | 4.6 km || 
|-id=815 bgcolor=#d6d6d6
| 56815 ||  || — || August 1, 2000 || Socorro || LINEAR || CRO || align=right | 10 km || 
|-id=816 bgcolor=#E9E9E9
| 56816 || 2000 QQ || — || August 21, 2000 || Reedy Creek || J. Broughton || — || align=right | 5.1 km || 
|-id=817 bgcolor=#fefefe
| 56817 ||  || — || August 23, 2000 || Reedy Creek || J. Broughton || PHO || align=right | 3.1 km || 
|-id=818 bgcolor=#d6d6d6
| 56818 ||  || — || August 24, 2000 || Socorro || LINEAR || EOS || align=right | 5.4 km || 
|-id=819 bgcolor=#d6d6d6
| 56819 ||  || — || August 24, 2000 || Socorro || LINEAR || EOS || align=right | 4.6 km || 
|-id=820 bgcolor=#d6d6d6
| 56820 ||  || — || August 26, 2000 || Višnjan Observatory || K. Korlević, M. Jurić || EOS || align=right | 11 km || 
|-id=821 bgcolor=#fefefe
| 56821 ||  || — || August 24, 2000 || Socorro || LINEAR || MAS || align=right | 1.8 km || 
|-id=822 bgcolor=#d6d6d6
| 56822 ||  || — || August 24, 2000 || Socorro || LINEAR || KOR || align=right | 3.4 km || 
|-id=823 bgcolor=#E9E9E9
| 56823 ||  || — || August 24, 2000 || Socorro || LINEAR || PAD || align=right | 4.5 km || 
|-id=824 bgcolor=#d6d6d6
| 56824 ||  || — || August 24, 2000 || Socorro || LINEAR || KOR || align=right | 3.7 km || 
|-id=825 bgcolor=#E9E9E9
| 56825 ||  || — || August 24, 2000 || Socorro || LINEAR || — || align=right | 3.1 km || 
|-id=826 bgcolor=#E9E9E9
| 56826 ||  || — || August 25, 2000 || Socorro || LINEAR || — || align=right | 5.1 km || 
|-id=827 bgcolor=#d6d6d6
| 56827 ||  || — || August 24, 2000 || Socorro || LINEAR || — || align=right | 5.6 km || 
|-id=828 bgcolor=#d6d6d6
| 56828 ||  || — || August 24, 2000 || Socorro || LINEAR || HYG || align=right | 6.2 km || 
|-id=829 bgcolor=#d6d6d6
| 56829 ||  || — || August 24, 2000 || Socorro || LINEAR || KOR || align=right | 3.6 km || 
|-id=830 bgcolor=#d6d6d6
| 56830 ||  || — || August 25, 2000 || Socorro || LINEAR || — || align=right | 5.5 km || 
|-id=831 bgcolor=#d6d6d6
| 56831 ||  || — || August 26, 2000 || Socorro || LINEAR || EOS || align=right | 5.1 km || 
|-id=832 bgcolor=#E9E9E9
| 56832 ||  || — || August 26, 2000 || Socorro || LINEAR || — || align=right | 5.9 km || 
|-id=833 bgcolor=#d6d6d6
| 56833 ||  || — || August 26, 2000 || Socorro || LINEAR || — || align=right | 7.4 km || 
|-id=834 bgcolor=#E9E9E9
| 56834 ||  || — || August 28, 2000 || Višnjan Observatory || K. Korlević || GEF || align=right | 4.0 km || 
|-id=835 bgcolor=#E9E9E9
| 56835 ||  || — || August 24, 2000 || Socorro || LINEAR || — || align=right | 3.4 km || 
|-id=836 bgcolor=#d6d6d6
| 56836 ||  || — || August 24, 2000 || Socorro || LINEAR || — || align=right | 5.4 km || 
|-id=837 bgcolor=#d6d6d6
| 56837 ||  || — || August 24, 2000 || Socorro || LINEAR || — || align=right | 7.1 km || 
|-id=838 bgcolor=#E9E9E9
| 56838 ||  || — || August 24, 2000 || Socorro || LINEAR || HOF || align=right | 8.7 km || 
|-id=839 bgcolor=#E9E9E9
| 56839 ||  || — || August 24, 2000 || Socorro || LINEAR || — || align=right | 4.3 km || 
|-id=840 bgcolor=#E9E9E9
| 56840 ||  || — || August 24, 2000 || Socorro || LINEAR || ADE || align=right | 6.4 km || 
|-id=841 bgcolor=#d6d6d6
| 56841 ||  || — || August 24, 2000 || Socorro || LINEAR || EOS || align=right | 6.0 km || 
|-id=842 bgcolor=#fefefe
| 56842 ||  || — || August 24, 2000 || Socorro || LINEAR || — || align=right | 2.2 km || 
|-id=843 bgcolor=#d6d6d6
| 56843 ||  || — || August 24, 2000 || Socorro || LINEAR || CHA || align=right | 4.6 km || 
|-id=844 bgcolor=#E9E9E9
| 56844 ||  || — || August 24, 2000 || Socorro || LINEAR || — || align=right | 2.3 km || 
|-id=845 bgcolor=#E9E9E9
| 56845 ||  || — || August 24, 2000 || Socorro || LINEAR || VIB || align=right | 2.8 km || 
|-id=846 bgcolor=#d6d6d6
| 56846 ||  || — || August 24, 2000 || Socorro || LINEAR || — || align=right | 5.6 km || 
|-id=847 bgcolor=#E9E9E9
| 56847 ||  || — || August 26, 2000 || Socorro || LINEAR || — || align=right | 5.4 km || 
|-id=848 bgcolor=#E9E9E9
| 56848 ||  || — || August 26, 2000 || Socorro || LINEAR || — || align=right | 3.4 km || 
|-id=849 bgcolor=#E9E9E9
| 56849 ||  || — || August 28, 2000 || Socorro || LINEAR || — || align=right | 3.3 km || 
|-id=850 bgcolor=#d6d6d6
| 56850 ||  || — || August 28, 2000 || Socorro || LINEAR || — || align=right | 7.3 km || 
|-id=851 bgcolor=#d6d6d6
| 56851 ||  || — || August 28, 2000 || Socorro || LINEAR || — || align=right | 4.6 km || 
|-id=852 bgcolor=#d6d6d6
| 56852 ||  || — || August 28, 2000 || Socorro || LINEAR || SAN || align=right | 3.8 km || 
|-id=853 bgcolor=#d6d6d6
| 56853 ||  || — || August 28, 2000 || Socorro || LINEAR || — || align=right | 7.8 km || 
|-id=854 bgcolor=#d6d6d6
| 56854 ||  || — || August 24, 2000 || Socorro || LINEAR || — || align=right | 5.0 km || 
|-id=855 bgcolor=#d6d6d6
| 56855 ||  || — || August 24, 2000 || Socorro || LINEAR || — || align=right | 5.5 km || 
|-id=856 bgcolor=#E9E9E9
| 56856 ||  || — || August 24, 2000 || Socorro || LINEAR || — || align=right | 5.7 km || 
|-id=857 bgcolor=#d6d6d6
| 56857 ||  || — || August 24, 2000 || Socorro || LINEAR || ALA || align=right | 8.0 km || 
|-id=858 bgcolor=#E9E9E9
| 56858 ||  || — || August 24, 2000 || Socorro || LINEAR || — || align=right | 2.9 km || 
|-id=859 bgcolor=#d6d6d6
| 56859 ||  || — || August 24, 2000 || Socorro || LINEAR || — || align=right | 6.8 km || 
|-id=860 bgcolor=#E9E9E9
| 56860 ||  || — || August 25, 2000 || Socorro || LINEAR || — || align=right | 6.5 km || 
|-id=861 bgcolor=#d6d6d6
| 56861 ||  || — || August 25, 2000 || Socorro || LINEAR || — || align=right | 6.5 km || 
|-id=862 bgcolor=#d6d6d6
| 56862 ||  || — || August 25, 2000 || Socorro || LINEAR || — || align=right | 9.4 km || 
|-id=863 bgcolor=#d6d6d6
| 56863 ||  || — || August 25, 2000 || Socorro || LINEAR || — || align=right | 4.1 km || 
|-id=864 bgcolor=#d6d6d6
| 56864 ||  || — || August 25, 2000 || Socorro || LINEAR || EUP || align=right | 10 km || 
|-id=865 bgcolor=#d6d6d6
| 56865 ||  || — || August 25, 2000 || Socorro || LINEAR || ALA || align=right | 7.6 km || 
|-id=866 bgcolor=#d6d6d6
| 56866 ||  || — || August 26, 2000 || Socorro || LINEAR || URS || align=right | 10 km || 
|-id=867 bgcolor=#d6d6d6
| 56867 ||  || — || August 28, 2000 || Socorro || LINEAR || — || align=right | 3.7 km || 
|-id=868 bgcolor=#d6d6d6
| 56868 ||  || — || August 28, 2000 || Socorro || LINEAR || ALA || align=right | 9.4 km || 
|-id=869 bgcolor=#d6d6d6
| 56869 ||  || — || August 28, 2000 || Socorro || LINEAR || — || align=right | 4.4 km || 
|-id=870 bgcolor=#d6d6d6
| 56870 ||  || — || August 28, 2000 || Socorro || LINEAR || — || align=right | 4.1 km || 
|-id=871 bgcolor=#d6d6d6
| 56871 ||  || — || August 29, 2000 || Socorro || LINEAR || HYG || align=right | 7.3 km || 
|-id=872 bgcolor=#d6d6d6
| 56872 ||  || — || August 29, 2000 || Socorro || LINEAR || — || align=right | 6.5 km || 
|-id=873 bgcolor=#E9E9E9
| 56873 ||  || — || August 24, 2000 || Socorro || LINEAR || — || align=right | 4.2 km || 
|-id=874 bgcolor=#d6d6d6
| 56874 ||  || — || August 24, 2000 || Socorro || LINEAR || EUP || align=right | 8.8 km || 
|-id=875 bgcolor=#d6d6d6
| 56875 ||  || — || August 24, 2000 || Socorro || LINEAR || MRC || align=right | 5.5 km || 
|-id=876 bgcolor=#E9E9E9
| 56876 ||  || — || August 24, 2000 || Socorro || LINEAR || — || align=right | 3.4 km || 
|-id=877 bgcolor=#d6d6d6
| 56877 ||  || — || August 24, 2000 || Socorro || LINEAR || — || align=right | 4.5 km || 
|-id=878 bgcolor=#d6d6d6
| 56878 ||  || — || August 25, 2000 || Socorro || LINEAR || — || align=right | 6.6 km || 
|-id=879 bgcolor=#d6d6d6
| 56879 ||  || — || August 25, 2000 || Socorro || LINEAR || EMA || align=right | 9.4 km || 
|-id=880 bgcolor=#d6d6d6
| 56880 ||  || — || August 25, 2000 || Socorro || LINEAR || EOS || align=right | 5.5 km || 
|-id=881 bgcolor=#d6d6d6
| 56881 ||  || — || August 25, 2000 || Socorro || LINEAR || 7:4 || align=right | 11 km || 
|-id=882 bgcolor=#E9E9E9
| 56882 ||  || — || August 25, 2000 || Socorro || LINEAR || — || align=right | 6.4 km || 
|-id=883 bgcolor=#d6d6d6
| 56883 ||  || — || August 31, 2000 || Socorro || LINEAR || EOS || align=right | 4.9 km || 
|-id=884 bgcolor=#d6d6d6
| 56884 ||  || — || August 31, 2000 || Socorro || LINEAR || — || align=right | 8.1 km || 
|-id=885 bgcolor=#d6d6d6
| 56885 ||  || — || August 24, 2000 || Socorro || LINEAR || — || align=right | 10 km || 
|-id=886 bgcolor=#E9E9E9
| 56886 ||  || — || August 24, 2000 || Socorro || LINEAR || AGN || align=right | 2.9 km || 
|-id=887 bgcolor=#fefefe
| 56887 ||  || — || August 26, 2000 || Socorro || LINEAR || FLO || align=right | 1.9 km || 
|-id=888 bgcolor=#d6d6d6
| 56888 ||  || — || August 26, 2000 || Socorro || LINEAR || — || align=right | 7.4 km || 
|-id=889 bgcolor=#d6d6d6
| 56889 ||  || — || August 29, 2000 || Socorro || LINEAR || HYG || align=right | 9.4 km || 
|-id=890 bgcolor=#d6d6d6
| 56890 ||  || — || August 31, 2000 || Socorro || LINEAR || — || align=right | 4.1 km || 
|-id=891 bgcolor=#E9E9E9
| 56891 ||  || — || August 31, 2000 || Socorro || LINEAR || EUN || align=right | 4.6 km || 
|-id=892 bgcolor=#d6d6d6
| 56892 ||  || — || August 31, 2000 || Socorro || LINEAR || EOS || align=right | 3.5 km || 
|-id=893 bgcolor=#E9E9E9
| 56893 ||  || — || August 31, 2000 || Socorro || LINEAR || EUN || align=right | 2.8 km || 
|-id=894 bgcolor=#d6d6d6
| 56894 ||  || — || August 31, 2000 || Socorro || LINEAR || — || align=right | 5.2 km || 
|-id=895 bgcolor=#d6d6d6
| 56895 ||  || — || August 25, 2000 || Socorro || LINEAR || TEL || align=right | 3.2 km || 
|-id=896 bgcolor=#E9E9E9
| 56896 ||  || — || August 31, 2000 || Socorro || LINEAR || — || align=right | 4.3 km || 
|-id=897 bgcolor=#d6d6d6
| 56897 ||  || — || August 31, 2000 || Socorro || LINEAR || EOS || align=right | 5.0 km || 
|-id=898 bgcolor=#d6d6d6
| 56898 ||  || — || August 31, 2000 || Socorro || LINEAR || EOS || align=right | 4.7 km || 
|-id=899 bgcolor=#E9E9E9
| 56899 ||  || — || August 31, 2000 || Socorro || LINEAR || — || align=right | 5.1 km || 
|-id=900 bgcolor=#d6d6d6
| 56900 ||  || — || August 31, 2000 || Socorro || LINEAR || EOS || align=right | 4.4 km || 
|}

56901–57000 

|-bgcolor=#d6d6d6
| 56901 ||  || — || August 31, 2000 || Socorro || LINEAR || — || align=right | 3.8 km || 
|-id=902 bgcolor=#d6d6d6
| 56902 ||  || — || August 31, 2000 || Socorro || LINEAR || — || align=right | 6.8 km || 
|-id=903 bgcolor=#d6d6d6
| 56903 ||  || — || August 31, 2000 || Socorro || LINEAR || — || align=right | 4.5 km || 
|-id=904 bgcolor=#E9E9E9
| 56904 ||  || — || August 31, 2000 || Socorro || LINEAR || — || align=right | 4.8 km || 
|-id=905 bgcolor=#E9E9E9
| 56905 ||  || — || August 31, 2000 || Socorro || LINEAR || — || align=right | 6.3 km || 
|-id=906 bgcolor=#d6d6d6
| 56906 ||  || — || August 26, 2000 || Socorro || LINEAR || — || align=right | 7.5 km || 
|-id=907 bgcolor=#d6d6d6
| 56907 ||  || — || August 26, 2000 || Socorro || LINEAR || EOS || align=right | 6.7 km || 
|-id=908 bgcolor=#E9E9E9
| 56908 ||  || — || August 26, 2000 || Socorro || LINEAR || — || align=right | 2.7 km || 
|-id=909 bgcolor=#d6d6d6
| 56909 ||  || — || August 26, 2000 || Socorro || LINEAR || — || align=right | 4.5 km || 
|-id=910 bgcolor=#d6d6d6
| 56910 ||  || — || August 26, 2000 || Socorro || LINEAR || EOS || align=right | 6.6 km || 
|-id=911 bgcolor=#d6d6d6
| 56911 ||  || — || August 26, 2000 || Socorro || LINEAR || — || align=right | 9.2 km || 
|-id=912 bgcolor=#E9E9E9
| 56912 ||  || — || August 26, 2000 || Socorro || LINEAR || — || align=right | 5.7 km || 
|-id=913 bgcolor=#d6d6d6
| 56913 ||  || — || August 29, 2000 || Socorro || LINEAR || EOS || align=right | 3.8 km || 
|-id=914 bgcolor=#d6d6d6
| 56914 ||  || — || August 29, 2000 || Socorro || LINEAR || — || align=right | 3.0 km || 
|-id=915 bgcolor=#E9E9E9
| 56915 ||  || — || August 31, 2000 || Socorro || LINEAR || EUN || align=right | 3.6 km || 
|-id=916 bgcolor=#d6d6d6
| 56916 ||  || — || August 31, 2000 || Socorro || LINEAR || — || align=right | 6.5 km || 
|-id=917 bgcolor=#d6d6d6
| 56917 ||  || — || August 21, 2000 || Anderson Mesa || LONEOS || URS || align=right | 9.2 km || 
|-id=918 bgcolor=#d6d6d6
| 56918 ||  || — || August 31, 2000 || Socorro || LINEAR || ALA || align=right | 9.0 km || 
|-id=919 bgcolor=#d6d6d6
| 56919 ||  || — || August 21, 2000 || Anderson Mesa || LONEOS || — || align=right | 7.1 km || 
|-id=920 bgcolor=#d6d6d6
| 56920 ||  || — || September 1, 2000 || Socorro || LINEAR || ALA || align=right | 10 km || 
|-id=921 bgcolor=#d6d6d6
| 56921 ||  || — || September 1, 2000 || Socorro || LINEAR || EOS || align=right | 4.7 km || 
|-id=922 bgcolor=#d6d6d6
| 56922 ||  || — || September 1, 2000 || Socorro || LINEAR || EOS || align=right | 5.5 km || 
|-id=923 bgcolor=#d6d6d6
| 56923 ||  || — || September 1, 2000 || Socorro || LINEAR || — || align=right | 5.7 km || 
|-id=924 bgcolor=#d6d6d6
| 56924 ||  || — || September 1, 2000 || Socorro || LINEAR || — || align=right | 6.4 km || 
|-id=925 bgcolor=#E9E9E9
| 56925 ||  || — || September 1, 2000 || Socorro || LINEAR || EUN || align=right | 3.6 km || 
|-id=926 bgcolor=#d6d6d6
| 56926 ||  || — || September 1, 2000 || Socorro || LINEAR || — || align=right | 4.0 km || 
|-id=927 bgcolor=#d6d6d6
| 56927 ||  || — || September 1, 2000 || Socorro || LINEAR || — || align=right | 4.2 km || 
|-id=928 bgcolor=#d6d6d6
| 56928 ||  || — || September 1, 2000 || Socorro || LINEAR || — || align=right | 8.8 km || 
|-id=929 bgcolor=#d6d6d6
| 56929 ||  || — || September 1, 2000 || Socorro || LINEAR || — || align=right | 6.1 km || 
|-id=930 bgcolor=#d6d6d6
| 56930 ||  || — || September 1, 2000 || Socorro || LINEAR || EOS || align=right | 6.8 km || 
|-id=931 bgcolor=#d6d6d6
| 56931 ||  || — || September 1, 2000 || Socorro || LINEAR || — || align=right | 6.9 km || 
|-id=932 bgcolor=#d6d6d6
| 56932 ||  || — || September 3, 2000 || Socorro || LINEAR || EUP || align=right | 9.3 km || 
|-id=933 bgcolor=#E9E9E9
| 56933 ||  || — || September 3, 2000 || Socorro || LINEAR || — || align=right | 4.0 km || 
|-id=934 bgcolor=#d6d6d6
| 56934 ||  || — || September 3, 2000 || Socorro || LINEAR || EOS || align=right | 6.0 km || 
|-id=935 bgcolor=#d6d6d6
| 56935 ||  || — || September 3, 2000 || Socorro || LINEAR || — || align=right | 12 km || 
|-id=936 bgcolor=#d6d6d6
| 56936 ||  || — || September 1, 2000 || Socorro || LINEAR || URS || align=right | 11 km || 
|-id=937 bgcolor=#E9E9E9
| 56937 ||  || — || September 3, 2000 || Socorro || LINEAR || — || align=right | 7.5 km || 
|-id=938 bgcolor=#E9E9E9
| 56938 ||  || — || September 1, 2000 || Socorro || LINEAR || EUN || align=right | 6.3 km || 
|-id=939 bgcolor=#d6d6d6
| 56939 ||  || — || September 2, 2000 || Socorro || LINEAR || — || align=right | 8.4 km || 
|-id=940 bgcolor=#E9E9E9
| 56940 ||  || — || September 2, 2000 || Socorro || LINEAR || GEF || align=right | 4.3 km || 
|-id=941 bgcolor=#E9E9E9
| 56941 ||  || — || September 2, 2000 || Socorro || LINEAR || — || align=right | 5.2 km || 
|-id=942 bgcolor=#d6d6d6
| 56942 ||  || — || September 3, 2000 || Socorro || LINEAR || VER || align=right | 12 km || 
|-id=943 bgcolor=#d6d6d6
| 56943 ||  || — || September 4, 2000 || Socorro || LINEAR || THM || align=right | 8.8 km || 
|-id=944 bgcolor=#d6d6d6
| 56944 ||  || — || September 2, 2000 || Socorro || LINEAR || — || align=right | 8.1 km || 
|-id=945 bgcolor=#E9E9E9
| 56945 ||  || — || September 3, 2000 || Socorro || LINEAR || — || align=right | 4.0 km || 
|-id=946 bgcolor=#d6d6d6
| 56946 ||  || — || September 3, 2000 || Socorro || LINEAR || EUP || align=right | 8.2 km || 
|-id=947 bgcolor=#d6d6d6
| 56947 ||  || — || September 4, 2000 || Kitt Peak || Spacewatch || JLI || align=right | 6.3 km || 
|-id=948 bgcolor=#d6d6d6
| 56948 ||  || — || September 5, 2000 || Anderson Mesa || LONEOS || — || align=right | 8.3 km || 
|-id=949 bgcolor=#d6d6d6
| 56949 ||  || — || September 5, 2000 || Anderson Mesa || LONEOS || — || align=right | 9.4 km || 
|-id=950 bgcolor=#FA8072
| 56950 ||  || — || September 20, 2000 || Socorro || LINEAR || PHO || align=right | 2.5 km || 
|-id=951 bgcolor=#C2FFFF
| 56951 ||  || — || September 20, 2000 || Socorro || LINEAR || L5 || align=right | 18 km || 
|-id=952 bgcolor=#d6d6d6
| 56952 ||  || — || September 20, 2000 || Socorro || LINEAR || NAE || align=right | 8.1 km || 
|-id=953 bgcolor=#d6d6d6
| 56953 ||  || — || September 20, 2000 || Socorro || LINEAR || ALA || align=right | 10 km || 
|-id=954 bgcolor=#E9E9E9
| 56954 ||  || — || September 24, 2000 || Bisei SG Center || BATTeRS || — || align=right | 9.2 km || 
|-id=955 bgcolor=#E9E9E9
| 56955 ||  || — || September 23, 2000 || Socorro || LINEAR || MAR || align=right | 4.4 km || 
|-id=956 bgcolor=#d6d6d6
| 56956 ||  || — || September 23, 2000 || Socorro || LINEAR || — || align=right | 4.7 km || 
|-id=957 bgcolor=#E9E9E9
| 56957 Seohideaki ||  ||  || September 24, 2000 || Bisei SG Center || BATTeRS || — || align=right | 9.7 km || 
|-id=958 bgcolor=#d6d6d6
| 56958 ||  || — || September 23, 2000 || Socorro || LINEAR || — || align=right | 12 km || 
|-id=959 bgcolor=#E9E9E9
| 56959 ||  || — || September 22, 2000 || Socorro || LINEAR || — || align=right | 6.6 km || 
|-id=960 bgcolor=#d6d6d6
| 56960 ||  || — || September 23, 2000 || Socorro || LINEAR || URS || align=right | 9.8 km || 
|-id=961 bgcolor=#d6d6d6
| 56961 ||  || — || September 24, 2000 || Socorro || LINEAR || — || align=right | 5.2 km || 
|-id=962 bgcolor=#C2FFFF
| 56962 ||  || — || September 24, 2000 || Socorro || LINEAR || L5 || align=right | 18 km || 
|-id=963 bgcolor=#d6d6d6
| 56963 ||  || — || September 24, 2000 || Socorro || LINEAR || — || align=right | 7.0 km || 
|-id=964 bgcolor=#d6d6d6
| 56964 ||  || — || September 24, 2000 || Socorro || LINEAR || — || align=right | 6.5 km || 
|-id=965 bgcolor=#d6d6d6
| 56965 ||  || — || September 24, 2000 || Socorro || LINEAR || — || align=right | 7.3 km || 
|-id=966 bgcolor=#E9E9E9
| 56966 ||  || — || September 24, 2000 || Socorro || LINEAR || — || align=right | 4.4 km || 
|-id=967 bgcolor=#d6d6d6
| 56967 ||  || — || September 23, 2000 || Socorro || LINEAR || URS || align=right | 10 km || 
|-id=968 bgcolor=#C2FFFF
| 56968 ||  || — || September 23, 2000 || Socorro || LINEAR || L5 || align=right | 26 km || 
|-id=969 bgcolor=#d6d6d6
| 56969 ||  || — || September 24, 2000 || Socorro || LINEAR || — || align=right | 7.5 km || 
|-id=970 bgcolor=#d6d6d6
| 56970 ||  || — || September 24, 2000 || Socorro || LINEAR || LIX || align=right | 13 km || 
|-id=971 bgcolor=#d6d6d6
| 56971 ||  || — || September 24, 2000 || Socorro || LINEAR || THM || align=right | 8.0 km || 
|-id=972 bgcolor=#E9E9E9
| 56972 ||  || — || September 23, 2000 || Socorro || LINEAR || GEF || align=right | 3.1 km || 
|-id=973 bgcolor=#d6d6d6
| 56973 ||  || — || September 23, 2000 || Socorro || LINEAR || — || align=right | 8.6 km || 
|-id=974 bgcolor=#d6d6d6
| 56974 ||  || — || September 23, 2000 || Socorro || LINEAR || SYL7:4 || align=right | 11 km || 
|-id=975 bgcolor=#d6d6d6
| 56975 ||  || — || September 19, 2000 || Haleakala || NEAT || 7:4 || align=right | 9.2 km || 
|-id=976 bgcolor=#C2FFFF
| 56976 ||  || — || September 20, 2000 || Haleakala || NEAT || L5 || align=right | 23 km || 
|-id=977 bgcolor=#E9E9E9
| 56977 ||  || — || September 28, 2000 || Socorro || LINEAR || — || align=right | 6.1 km || 
|-id=978 bgcolor=#d6d6d6
| 56978 ||  || — || September 28, 2000 || Socorro || LINEAR || ALA || align=right | 11 km || 
|-id=979 bgcolor=#d6d6d6
| 56979 ||  || — || September 28, 2000 || Socorro || LINEAR || — || align=right | 10 km || 
|-id=980 bgcolor=#d6d6d6
| 56980 ||  || — || September 28, 2000 || Socorro || LINEAR || — || align=right | 10 km || 
|-id=981 bgcolor=#d6d6d6
| 56981 ||  || — || September 20, 2000 || Socorro || LINEAR || — || align=right | 8.8 km || 
|-id=982 bgcolor=#d6d6d6
| 56982 ||  || — || September 22, 2000 || Kitt Peak || Spacewatch || HIL3:2 || align=right | 13 km || 
|-id=983 bgcolor=#d6d6d6
| 56983 ||  || — || September 23, 2000 || Kitt Peak || Spacewatch || — || align=right | 6.0 km || 
|-id=984 bgcolor=#d6d6d6
| 56984 ||  || — || September 24, 2000 || Socorro || LINEAR || — || align=right | 6.5 km || 
|-id=985 bgcolor=#d6d6d6
| 56985 ||  || — || September 24, 2000 || Socorro || LINEAR || SHU3:2 || align=right | 9.6 km || 
|-id=986 bgcolor=#d6d6d6
| 56986 ||  || — || September 25, 2000 || Socorro || LINEAR || — || align=right | 12 km || 
|-id=987 bgcolor=#d6d6d6
| 56987 ||  || — || September 25, 2000 || Socorro || LINEAR || 7:4 || align=right | 9.0 km || 
|-id=988 bgcolor=#d6d6d6
| 56988 ||  || — || September 24, 2000 || Socorro || LINEAR || — || align=right | 4.7 km || 
|-id=989 bgcolor=#d6d6d6
| 56989 ||  || — || September 24, 2000 || Socorro || LINEAR || KOR || align=right | 3.3 km || 
|-id=990 bgcolor=#d6d6d6
| 56990 ||  || — || September 24, 2000 || Socorro || LINEAR || — || align=right | 4.2 km || 
|-id=991 bgcolor=#d6d6d6
| 56991 ||  || — || September 23, 2000 || Socorro || LINEAR || — || align=right | 4.5 km || 
|-id=992 bgcolor=#d6d6d6
| 56992 ||  || — || September 25, 2000 || Socorro || LINEAR || — || align=right | 15 km || 
|-id=993 bgcolor=#d6d6d6
| 56993 ||  || — || September 27, 2000 || Socorro || LINEAR || HYG || align=right | 4.2 km || 
|-id=994 bgcolor=#d6d6d6
| 56994 ||  || — || September 27, 2000 || Socorro || LINEAR || URS || align=right | 11 km || 
|-id=995 bgcolor=#d6d6d6
| 56995 ||  || — || September 28, 2000 || Socorro || LINEAR || — || align=right | 7.5 km || 
|-id=996 bgcolor=#d6d6d6
| 56996 ||  || — || September 30, 2000 || Socorro || LINEAR || HIL3:2 || align=right | 14 km || 
|-id=997 bgcolor=#d6d6d6
| 56997 ||  || — || September 25, 2000 || Socorro || LINEAR || EUP || align=right | 13 km || 
|-id=998 bgcolor=#d6d6d6
| 56998 ||  || — || September 26, 2000 || Socorro || LINEAR || ALA || align=right | 15 km || 
|-id=999 bgcolor=#d6d6d6
| 56999 ||  || — || September 30, 2000 || Socorro || LINEAR || — || align=right | 6.4 km || 
|-id=000 bgcolor=#d6d6d6
| 57000 ||  || — || September 26, 2000 || Socorro || LINEAR || — || align=right | 15 km || 
|}

References

External links 
 Discovery Circumstances: Numbered Minor Planets (55001)–(60000) (IAU Minor Planet Center)

0056